The Iroquois ( or ), officially the Haudenosaunee ( meaning "people who are building the longhouse"), are an Iroquoian-speaking confederacy of First Nations peoples in northeast North America and Upstate New York. They were known during the colonial years to the French as the Iroquois League, and later as the Iroquois Confederacy. The English called them the Five Nations, comprising the Mohawk, Oneida, Onondaga, Cayuga, and Seneca (listed geographically from east to west). After 1722, the Iroquoian-speaking Tuscarora from the southeast were accepted into the confederacy, which became known as the Six Nations.

The Confederacy came about as a result of the Great Law of Peace, said to have been composed by Deganawidah the Great Peacemaker, Hiawatha, and Jigonsaseh the Mother of Nations. For nearly 200 years, the Six Nations/Haudenosaunee Confederacy were a powerful factor in North American colonial policy, with some scholars arguing for the concept of the Middle Ground, in that European powers were used by the Iroquois just as much as Europeans used them. At its peak around 1700, Iroquois power extended from what is today New York State, north into present-day Ontario and Quebec along the lower Great Lakes–upper St. Lawrence, and south on both sides of the Allegheny mountains into present-day Virginia and Kentucky and into the Ohio Valley.

The St. Lawrence Iroquoians, Wendat (Huron), Erie, and Susquehannock, all independent peoples known to the European colonists, also spoke Iroquoian languages. They are considered Iroquoian in a larger cultural sense, all being descended from the Proto-Iroquoian people and language. Historically, however, they were competitors and enemies of the Iroquois League nations.

In 2010, more than 45,000 enrolled Six Nations people lived in Canada, and over 81,000 in the United States.

Names
Haudenosaunee ("People of the Longhouse") is the autonym by which the Six Nations refer to themselves. While its exact etymology is debated, the term Iroquois is of colonial origin. Some scholars of Native American history consider "Iroquois" a derogatory name adopted from the traditional enemies of the Haudenosaunee.  A less common, older autonym for the confederation is Ongweh’onweh, meaning "original people".

Haudenosaunee derives from two phonetically similar but etymologically distinct words in the Seneca language: Hodínöhšö:ni:h, meaning "those of the extended house," and Hodínöhsö:ni:h, meaning "house builders". The name "Haudenosaunee" first appears in English in Lewis Henry Morgan's work (1851), where he writes it as Ho-dé-no-sau-nee. The spelling "Hotinnonsionni" is also attested from later in the nineteenth century. An alternative designation, Ganonsyoni, is occasionally encountered as well, from the Mohawk kanǫhsyǫ́·ni ("the extended house"), or from a cognate expression in a related Iroquoian language; in earlier sources it is variously spelled "Kanosoni", "akwanoschioni", "Aquanuschioni", "Cannassoone", "Canossoone", "Ke-nunctioni", or "Konossioni". More transparently, the Haudenosaunee confederacy is often referred to as the Six Nations (or, for the period before the entry of the Tuscarora in 1722, the Five Nations). The word is "Rotinonshón:ni" in the Mohawk language.

The origins of the name Iroquois are somewhat obscure, although the term has historically been more common among English texts than Haudenosaunee. Its first written appearance as "Irocois" is in Samuel de Champlain's account of his journey to Tadoussac in 1603. Other early French spellings include "Erocoise", "Hiroquois", "Hyroquoise", "Irecoies", "Iriquois", "Iroquaes", "Irroquois", and "Yroquois", pronounced at the time as [irokwe] or [irokwɛ]. Competing theories have been proposed for this term's origin, but none have gained widespread acceptance. By 1978 Ives Goddard wrote: "No such form is attested in any Indian language as a name for any Iroquoian group, and the ultimate origin and meaning of the name are unknown.".

Jesuit priest and missionary Pierre François Xavier de Charlevoix wrote in 1744:
The name Iroquois is purely French, and is formed from the [Iroquoian-language] term Hiro or Hero, which means I have said—with which these Indians close all their addresses, as the Latins did of old with their dixi—and of Koué, which is a cry sometimes of sadness, when it is prolonged, and sometimes of joy, when it is pronounced shorter.

In 1883, Horatio Hale wrote that Charlevoix's etymology was dubious, and that "no other nation or tribe of which we have any knowledge has ever borne a name composed in this whimsical fashion". Hale suggested instead that the term came from Huron, and was cognate with the Mohawk ierokwa- "they who smoke," or Cayuga iakwai- "a bear". In 1888, J.N.B. Hewitt expressed doubts that either of those words exist in the respective languages. He preferred the etymology from Montagnais irin "true, real" and ako "snake", plus the French -ois suffix. Later he revised this to Algonquin Iriⁿakhoiw as the origin.

A more modern etymology was advocated by Gordon M. Day in 1968, elaborating upon Charles Arnaud from 1880. Arnaud had claimed that the word came from Montagnais , meaning "terrible man", via the reduced form . Day proposed a hypothetical Montagnais phrase , meaning "a man, an Iroquois", as the origin of this term.

The Gale Encyclopedia of Multicultural America attests the origin of Iroquois to "Iroqu," Algonquian for "rattlesnake". The French encountered the Algonquian-speaking tribes first, and would have learned the Algonquian names for their Iroquois competitors.

Iroquois Confederacy

The Iroquois Confederacy or Haudenosaunee is believed to have been founded by the Great Peacemaker at an unknown date estimated between 1450 and 1660, bringing together five distinct nations in the southern Great Lakes area into "The Great League of Peace". Other research, however, suggests the founding occurred in 1142. Each nation within this Iroquoian confederacy had a distinct language, territory, and function in the League.

The League is governed by a Grand Council, an assembly of fifty chiefs or sachems, each representing a clan of a nation.

When Europeans first arrived in North America, the Haudenosaunee (Iroquois League to the French, Five Nations to the British) were based in what is now central and west New York State including the Finger Lakes region, occupying large areas north to the St. Lawrence River, east to Montreal and the Hudson River, and south into what is today northwestern Pennsylvania. At its peak around 1700, Iroquois power extended from what is today New York State, north into present-day Ontario and Quebec along the lower Great Lakes–upper St. Lawrence, and south on both sides of the Allegheny Mountains into present-day Virginia and Kentucky and into the Ohio Valley. From east to west, the League was composed of the Mohawk, Oneida, Onondaga, Cayuga, and Seneca nations. In about 1722, the Iroquoian-speaking Tuscarora joined the League, having migrated northwards from the Carolinas after a bloody conflict with white settlers. A shared cultural background with the Five Nations of the Iroquois (and a sponsorship from the Oneida) led the Tuscarora to becoming accepted as the sixth nation in the confederacy in 1722; the Iroquois become known afterwards as the Six Nations.

Other independent Iroquoian-speaking peoples, such as the Erie, Susquehannock, Huron (Wendat) and Wyandot, lived at various times along the St. Lawrence River, and around the Great Lakes. In the American Southeast, the Cherokee were an Iroquoian-language people who had migrated to that area centuries before European contact. None of these were part of the Haudenosaunee League. Those on the borders of Haudenosaunee territory in the Great Lakes region competed and warred with the nations of the League.

French, Dutch and English colonists, both in New France (Canada) and what became the Thirteen Colonies, recognized a need to gain favor with the Iroquois people, who occupied a significant portion of lands west of the colonial settlements. Their first relations were for fur trading, which became highly lucrative for both sides. The colonists also sought to establish friendly relations to secure their settlement borders.

For nearly 200 years, the Iroquois were a powerful factor in North American colonial policy. Alliance with the Iroquois offered political and strategic advantages to the European powers, but the Iroquois preserved considerable independence. Some of their people settled in mission villages along the St. Lawrence River, becoming more closely tied to the French. While they participated in French-led raids on Dutch and English colonial settlements, where some Mohawk and other Iroquois settled, in general the Iroquois resisted attacking their own peoples.

The Iroquois remained a large politically united Native American polity until the American Revolution, when the League kept its treaty promises to the British Crown. After their defeat, the British ceded Iroquois territory without consultation, and many Iroquois had to abandon their lands in the Mohawk Valley and elsewhere and relocate to the northern lands retained by the British. The Crown gave them land in compensation for the five million acres they had lost in the south, but it was not equivalent to earlier territory.

Modern scholars of the Iroquois distinguish between the League and the Confederacy. According to this interpretation, the Iroquois League refers to the ceremonial and cultural institution embodied in the Grand Council, which still exists. The Iroquois Confederacy was the decentralized political and diplomatic entity that emerged in response to European colonization, which was dissolved after the British defeat in the American Revolutionary War. Today's Iroquois/Six Nations people do not make any such distinction, use the terms interchangeably, but prefer the name Haudenosaunee Confederacy.

After the migration of a majority to Canada, the Iroquois remaining in New York were required to live mostly on reservations. In 1784, a total of 6,000 Iroquois faced 240,000 New Yorkers, with land-hungry New Englanders poised to migrate west. "Oneidas alone, who were only 600 strong, owned six million acres, or about 2.4 million hectares. Iroquoia was a land rush waiting to happen." By the War of 1812, the Iroquois had lost control of considerable territory.

History

Historiography
Previous research, containing the discovery of Iroquois tools and artefacts, suggests that the origin of the Iroquois was in Montreal, Canada, near the St. Lawrence River. After an unsuccessful rebellion, they were driven out of Quebec to New York.

Knowledge of Iroquois history stem from Haudenosaunee oral tradition, archaeological evidence, accounts from Jesuit missionaries, and subsequent European historians. Historian Scott Stevens credits the early modern European value of written sources over oral tradition as contributing to a racialized, prejudiced perspective about the Iroquois through the 19th century. The historiography of the Iroquois peoples is a topic of much debate, especially regarding the American colonial period.

French Jesuit accounts of the Iroquois portrayed them as savages lacking government, law, letters, and religion. But the Jesuits made considerable effort to study their languages and cultures, and some came to respect them. A source of confusion for European sources, coming from a patriarchal society, was the matrilineal kinship system of Iroquois society and the related power of women. The Canadian historian D. Peter MacLeod wrote about the Canadian Iroquois and the French in the time of the Seven Years' War: 
Most critically, the importance of clan mothers, who possessed considerable economic and political power within Canadian Iroquois communities, was blithely overlooked by patriarchal European scribes. Those references that do exist, show clan mothers meeting in council with their male counterparts to take decisions regarding war and peace and joining in delegations to confront the Onontio [the Iroquois term for the French governor-general] and the French leadership in Montreal, but only hint at the real influence wielded by these women.

Eighteenth-century English historiography focuses on the diplomatic relations with the Iroquois, supplemented by such images as John Verelst's Four Mohawk Kings, and publications such as the Anglo-Iroquoian treaty proceedings printed by Benjamin Franklin. A persistent 19th and 20th century narrative casts the Iroquois as "an expansive military and political power ... [who] subjugated their enemies by violent force and for almost two centuries acted as the fulcrum in the balance of power in colonial North America".

Historian Scott Stevens noted that the Iroquois themselves began to influence the writing of their history in the 19th century, including Joseph Brant (Mohawk), and David Cusick (Tuscarora, 1780–1840). John Arthur Gibson (Seneca, 1850–1912) was an important figure of his generation in recounting versions of Iroquois history in epics on the Peacemaker. Notable women historians among the Iroquois emerged in the following decades, including Laura "Minnie" Kellog (Oneida, 1880–1949) and Alice Lee Jemison (Seneca, 1901–1964).

Formation of the League

The Iroquois League was established prior to European contact, with the banding together of five of the many Iroquoian peoples who had emerged south of the Great Lakes. Many archaeologists and anthropologists believe that the League was formed about 1450, though arguments have been made for an earlier date. One theory argues that the League formed shortly after a solar eclipse on August 31, 1142, an event thought to be expressed in oral tradition about the League's origins. Some sources link an early origin of the Iroquois confederacy to the adoption of corn as a staple crop.

Anthropologist Dean Snow argues that the archaeological evidence does not support a date earlier than 1450. He has said that recent claims for a much earlier date "may be for contemporary political purposes". Other scholars note that anthropological researchers consulted only male informants, thus losing the half of the historical story told in the distinct oral traditions of women. For this reason, origin tales tend to emphasize the two men Deganawidah and Hiawatha, while the woman Jigonsaseh, who plays a prominent role in the female tradition, remains largely unknown.

The founders of League are traditionally held to be Dekanawida the Great Peacemaker, Hiawatha, and Jigonhsasee the Mother of Nations, whose home acted as a sort of United Nations. They brought the Peacemaker's Great Law of Peace to the squabbling Iroquoian nations who were fighting, raiding, and feuding with each other and with other tribes, both Algonkian and Iroquoian. Five nations originally joined in the League, giving rise to the many historic references to "Five Nations of the Iroquois." With the addition of the southern Tuscarora in the 18th century, these original five tribes still compose the Haudenosaunee in the early 21st century: the Mohawk, Onondaga, Oneida, Cayuga, and Seneca.

According to legend, an evil Onondaga chieftain named Tadodaho was the last converted to the ways of peace by The Great Peacemaker and Hiawatha. He was offered the position as the titular chair of the League's Council, representing the unity of all nations of the League. This is said to have occurred at Onondaga Lake near present-day Syracuse, New York. The title Tadodaho is still used for the League's chair, the fiftieth chief who sits with the Onondaga in council.

The Iroquois subsequently created a highly egalitarian society. One British colonial administrator declared in 1749 that the Iroquois had "such absolute Notions of Liberty that they allow no Kind of Superiority of one over another, and banish all Servitude from their Territories". As raids between the member tribes ended and they directed warfare against competitors, the Iroquois increased in numbers while their rivals declined. The political cohesion of the Iroquois rapidly became one of the strongest forces in 17th- and 18th-century northeastern North America.

The League's council of fifty ruled on disputes and sought consensus. However, the confederacy did not speak for all five tribes, which continued to act independently and form their own war bands. Around 1678, the council began to exert more power in negotiations with the colonial governments of Pennsylvania and New York, and the Iroquois became very adroit at diplomacy, playing off the French against the British as individual tribes had earlier played the Swedes, Dutch, and English.

Iroquoian-language peoples were involved in warfare and trading with nearby members of the Iroquois League. The explorer Robert La Salle in the 17th century identified the Mosopelea as among the Ohio Valley peoples defeated by the Iroquois in the early 1670s. The Erie and peoples of the upper Allegheny valley declined earlier during the Beaver Wars. By 1676 the power of the Susquehannock was broken from the effects of three years of epidemic disease, war with the Iroquois, and frontier battles, as settlers took advantage of the weakened tribe.

According to one theory of early Iroquois history, after becoming united in the League, the Iroquois invaded the Ohio River Valley in the territories that would become the eastern Ohio Country down as far as present-day Kentucky to seek additional hunting grounds. They displaced about 1,200 Siouan-speaking tribepeople of the Ohio River valley, such as the Quapaw (Akansea), Ofo (Mosopelea), and Tutelo and other closely related tribes out of the region. These tribes migrated to regions around the Mississippi River and the piedmont regions of the east coast.

Other Iroquoian-language peoples, including the populous Wyandot (Huron), with related social organization and cultures, became extinct as tribes as a result of disease and war. They did not join the League when invited and were much reduced after the Beaver Wars and high mortality from Eurasian infectious diseases. While the indigenous nations sometimes tried to remain neutral in the various colonial frontier wars, some also allied with Europeans, as in the French and Indian War, the North American front of the Seven Years' War. The Six Nations were split in their alliances between the French and British in that war.

Expansion
In Reflections in Bullough's Pond, historian Diana Muir argues that the pre-contact Iroquois were an imperialist, expansionist culture whose cultivation of the corn/beans/squash agricultural complex enabled them to support a large population. They made war primarily against neighboring Algonquian peoples. Muir uses archaeological data to argue that the Iroquois expansion onto Algonquian lands was checked by the Algonquian adoption of agriculture. This enabled them to support their own populations large enough to resist Iroquois conquest. The People of the Confederacy dispute this historical interpretation, regarding the League of the Great Peace as the foundation of their heritage.

The Iroquois may be the Kwedech described in the oral legends of the Mi'kmaq nation of Eastern Canada. These legends relate that the Mi'kmaq in the late pre-contact period had gradually driven their enemies – the Kwedech – westward across New Brunswick, and finally out of the Lower St. Lawrence River region. The Mi'kmaq named the last-conquered land Gespedeg or "last land," from which the French derived Gaspé. The "Kwedech" are generally considered to have been Iroquois, specifically the Mohawk; their expulsion from Gaspé by the Mi'kmaq has been estimated as occurring c. 1535–1600.

Around 1535, Jacques Cartier reported Iroquoian-speaking groups on the Gaspé peninsula and along the St. Lawrence River. Archeologists and anthropologists have defined the St. Lawrence Iroquoians as a distinct and separate group (and possibly several discrete groups), living in the villages of Hochelaga and others nearby (near present-day Montreal), which had been visited by Cartier. By 1608, when Samuel de Champlain visited the area, that part of the St. Lawrence River valley had no settlements, but was controlled by the Mohawk as a hunting ground. The fate of the Iroquoian people that Cartier encountered remains a mystery, and all that can be stated for certain is when Champlain arrived, they were gone. On the Gaspé peninsula, Champlain encountered Algonquian-speaking groups. The precise identity of any of these groups is still debated. On July 29, 1609, Champlain assisted his allies in defeating a Mohawk war party by the shores of what is now called Lake Champlain, and again in June 1610, Champlain fought against the Mohawks.

The Iroquois became well known in the southern colonies in the 17th century by this time. After the first English settlement in Jamestown, Virginia (1607), numerous 17th-century accounts describe a powerful people known to the Powhatan Confederacy as the Massawomeck, and to the French as the Antouhonoron. They were said to come from the north, beyond the Susquehannock territory. Historians have often identified the Massawomeck / Antouhonoron as the Haudenosaunee.

In 1649, an Iroquois war party, consisting mostly of Senecas and Mohawks, destroyed the Huron village of Wendake. In turn, this ultimately resulted in the breakup of the Huron nation. With no northern enemy remaining, the Iroquois turned their forces on the Neutral Nations on the north shore of Lakes Erie and Ontario, the Susquehannocks, their southern neighbor. Then they destroyed other Iroquoian-language tribes, including the Erie, to the west, in 1654, over competition for the fur trade. Then they destroyed the Mohicans. After their victories, they reigned supreme in an area from the Mississippi River to the Atlantic Ocean; from the St. Lawrence River to the Chesapeake Bay.

At that time the Iroquois numbered about 10,000, insufficient to offset the European population of 75,000 by 1660, 150,000 by 1680 and 250,000 by 1700. Michael O. Varhola has argued their success in conquering and subduing surrounding nations had paradoxically weakened a Native response to European growth, thereby becoming victims of their own success.

The Five Nations of the League established a trading relationship with the Dutch at Fort Orange (modern Albany, New York), trading furs for European goods, an economic relationship that profoundly changed their way of life and led to much over-hunting of beavers.

Between 1665 and 1670, the Iroquois established seven villages on the northern shores of Lake Ontario in present-day Ontario, collectively known as the "Iroquois du Nord" villages. The villages were all abandoned by 1701.

Over the years 1670–1710, the Five Nations achieved political dominance of much of Virginia west of the Fall Line and extending to the Ohio River valley in present-day West Virginia and Kentucky. As a result of the Beaver Wars, they pushed Siouan-speaking tribes out and reserved the territory as a hunting ground by right of conquest. They finally sold to British colonists their remaining claim to the lands south of the Ohio in 1768 at the Treaty of Fort Stanwix.

Historian Pekka Hämäläinen writes of the League, "There had never been anything like the Five Nations League in North America. No other Indigenous nation or confederacy had ever reached so far, conducted such an ambitious foreign policy, or commanded such fear and respect. The Five Nations blended diplomacy, intimidation, and violence as the circumstances dictated, creating a measured instability that only they could navigate. Their guiding principle was to avoid becoming attached to any single colony, which would restrict their options and risk exposure to external manipulation."

Beaver Wars

Beginning in 1609, the League engaged in the decades-long Beaver Wars against the French, their Huron allies, and other neighboring tribes, including the Petun, Erie, and Susquehannock. Trying to control access to game for the lucrative fur trade, they invaded the Algonquian peoples of the Atlantic coast (the Lenape, or Delaware), the Anishinaabe of the boreal Canadian Shield region, and not infrequently the English colonies as well. During the Beaver Wars, they were said to have defeated and assimilated the Huron (1649), Petun (1650), the Neutral Nation (1651), Erie Tribe (1657), and Susquehannock (1680). The traditional view is that these wars were a way to control the lucrative fur trade to purchase European goods on which they had become dependent. Starna questions this view.

Recent scholarship has elaborated on this view, arguing that the Beaver Wars were an escalation of the Iroquoian tradition of "Mourning Wars". This view suggests that the Iroquois launched large-scale attacks against neighboring tribes to avenge or replace the many dead from battles and smallpox epidemics.

In 1628, the Mohawk defeated the Mahican to gain a monopoly in the fur trade with the Dutch at Fort Orange (present-day Albany), New Netherland. The Mohawk would not allow northern native peoples to trade with the Dutch. By 1640, there were almost no beavers left on their lands, reducing the Iroquois to middlemen in the fur trade between Indian peoples to the west and north, and Europeans eager for the valuable thick beaver pelts. In 1645, a tentative peace was forged between the Iroquois and the Huron, Algonquin, and French.

In 1646, Jesuit missionaries at Sainte-Marie among the Hurons went as envoys to the Mohawk lands to protect the precarious peace. Mohawk attitudes toward the peace soured while the Jesuits were traveling, and their warriors attacked the party en route. The missionaries were taken to Ossernenon village, Kanienkeh (Mohawk Nation) (near present-day Auriesville, New York), where the moderate Turtle and Wolf clans recommended setting them free, but angry members of the Bear clan killed Jean de Lalande, and Isaac Jogues on October 18, 1646. The Catholic Church has commemorated the two French priests and Jesuit lay Brother René Goupil (killed September 29, 1642) as among the eight North American Martyrs.

In 1649 during the Beaver Wars, the Iroquois used recently purchased Dutch guns to attack the Huron, allies of the French. These attacks, primarily against the Huron towns of Taenhatentaron (St. Ignace) and St. Louis in what is now Simcoe County, Ontario were the final battles that effectively destroyed the Huron Confederacy. The Jesuit missions in Huronia on the shores of Georgian Bay were abandoned in the face of the Iroquois attacks, with the Jesuits leading the surviving Hurons east towards the French settlements on the St. Lawrence. The Jesuit Relations expressed some amazement that the Five Nations had been able to dominate the area "for five hundred leagues around, although their numbers are very small". From 1651 to 1652, the Iroquois attacked the Susquehannock, to their south in present-day Pennsylvania, without sustained success.

In the early 17th century, the Iroquois Confederacy was at the height of its power, with a total population of about 12,000. In 1653 the Onondaga Nation extended a peace invitation to New France. An expedition of Jesuits, led by Simon Le Moyne, established Sainte Marie de Ganentaa in 1656 in their territory. They were forced to abandon the mission by 1658 as hostilities resumed, possibly because of the sudden death of 500 native people from an epidemic of smallpox, a European infectious disease to which they had no immunity.

From 1658 to 1663, the Iroquois were at war with the Susquehannock and their Lenape and Province of Maryland allies. In 1663, a large Iroquois invasion force was defeated at the Susquehannock main fort. In 1663, the Iroquois were at war with the Sokoki tribe of the upper Connecticut River. Smallpox struck again, and through the effects of disease, famine, and war, the Iroquois were under threat of extinction. In 1664, an Oneida party struck at allies of the Susquehannock on Chesapeake Bay.

In 1665, three of the Five Nations made peace with the French. The following year, the Governor-General of New France, the Marquis de Tracy, sent the Carignan regiment to confront the Mohawk and Oneida. The Mohawk avoided battle, but the French burned their villages, which they referred to as "castles", and their crops. In 1667, the remaining two Iroquois Nations signed a peace treaty with the French and agreed to allow missionaries to visit their villages. The French Jesuit missionaries were known as the "black-robes" to the Iroquois, who began to urge that Catholic converts should relocate to the Caughnawaga, Kanienkeh outside of Montreal. This treaty lasted for 17 years.

1670–1701

Around 1670, the Iroquois drove the Siouan-speaking Mannahoac tribe out of the northern Virginia Piedmont region, and began to claim ownership of the territory. In 1672, they were defeated by a war party of Susquehannock, and the Iroquois appealed to the French Governor Frontenac for support:

Some old histories state that the Iroquois defeated the Susquehannock but this is undocumented and doubtful. In 1677, the Iroquois adopted the majority of the Iroquoian-speaking Susquehannock into their nation.

In January 1676, the Governor of New York colony, Edmund Andros, sent a letter to the chiefs of the Iroquois asking for their help in King Philip's War, as the English colonists in New England were having much difficulty fighting the Wampanoag led by Metacom. In exchange for precious guns from the English, an Iroquois war party devastated the Wampanoag in February 1676, destroying villages and food stores while taking many prisoners.

By 1677, the Iroquois formed an alliance with the English through an agreement known as the Covenant Chain. By 1680, the Iroquois Confederacy was in a strong position, having eliminated the Susquehannock and the Wampanoag, taken vast numbers of captives to augment their population, and secured an alliance with the English supplying guns and ammunition. Together the allies battled to a standstill the French and their allies the Hurons, traditional foes of the Confederacy. The Iroquois colonized the northern shore of Lake Ontario and sent raiding parties westward all the way to Illinois Country. The tribes of Illinois were eventually defeated, not by the Iroquois, but by the Potawatomi.

In 1679, the Susquehannock, with Iroquois help, attacked Maryland's Piscataway and Mattawoman allies. Peace was not reached until 1685. During the same period, French Jesuit missionaries were active in Iroquoia, which led to a voluntary mass relocation of many Haudenosaunee to the St. Lawrence valley at Kahnawake and Kanesatake near Montreal. It was the intention of the French to use the Catholic Haudenosaunee in the St. Lawrence valley as a buffer to keep the English-allied Haudenosaunee tribes, in what is now upstate New York, away from the center of the French fur trade in Montreal. The attempts of both the English and the French to make use of their Haudenosaunee allies were foiled, as the two groups of Haudenosaunee showed a "profound reluctance to kill one another". Following the move of the Catholic Iroquois to the St. Lawrence valley, historians commonly describe the Iroquois living outside of Montreal as the Canadian Iroquois, while those remaining in their historical heartland in modern upstate New York are described as the League Iroquois.

In 1684, the Governor General of New France, Joseph-Antoine Le Febvre de La Barre, decided to launch a punitive expedition against the Seneca, who were attacking French and Algonquian fur traders in the Mississippi river valley, and asked for the Catholic Haudenosaunee to contribute fighting men. La Barre's expedition ended in fiasco in September 1684 when influenza broke out among the French troupes de la Marine while the Canadian Iroquois warriors refused to fight, instead only engaging in battles of insults with the Seneca warriors. King Louis XIV of France was not amused when he heard of La Barre's failure, which led to his replacement with Jacques-René de Brisay de Denonville, Marquis de Denonville (governor general 1685–1689), who arrived in August with orders from the Sun King to crush the Haudenosaunee confederacy and uphold the honor of France even in the wilds of North America.

 In 1684, the Iroquois again invaded Virginia and Illinois territory and unsuccessfully attacked French outposts in the latter. Trying to reduce warfare in the Shenandoah Valley of Virginia, later that year the Virginia Colony agreed in a conference at Albany to recognize the Iroquois' right to use the North-South path, known as the Great Warpath, running east of the Blue Ridge, provided they did not intrude on the English settlements east of the Fall Line.

In 1687, the Marquis de Denonville set out for Fort Frontenac (modern Kingston, Ontario) with a well-organized force. In July 1687 Denonville took with him on his expedition a mixed force of troupes de la Marine, French-Canadian militiamen, and 353 Indian warriors from the Jesuit mission settlements, including 220 Haudenosaunee. They met under a flag of truce with 50 hereditary sachems from the Onondaga council fire, on the north shore of Lake Ontario in what is now southern Ontario. Denonville recaptured the fort for New France and seized, chained, and shipped the 50 Iroquois chiefs to Marseilles, France, to be used as galley slaves. Several of the Catholic Haudenosaunee were outraged at this treachery to a diplomatic party, which led to at least 100 of them to desert to the Seneca. Denonville justified enslaving the people he encountered, saying that as a "civilized European" he did not respect the customs of "savages" and would do as he liked with them. On August 13, 1687, an advance party of French soldiers walked into a Seneca ambush and were nearly killed to a man; however the Seneca fled when the main French force came up. The remaining Catholic Haudenosaunee warriors refused to pursue the retreating Seneca.

Denonville ravaged the land of the Seneca, landing a French armada at Irondequoit Bay, striking straight into the seat of Seneca power, and destroying many of its villages. Fleeing before the attack, the Seneca moved farther west, east and south down the Susquehanna River. Although great damage was done to their homeland, the Senecas' military might was not appreciably weakened. The Confederacy and the Seneca developed an alliance with the English who were settling in the east. The destruction of the Seneca land infuriated the members of the Iroquois Confederacy. On August 4, 1689, they retaliated by burning down Lachine, a small town adjacent to Montreal. Fifteen hundred Iroquois warriors had been harassing Montreal defenses for many months prior to that.

They finally exhausted and defeated Denonville and his forces. His tenure was followed by the return of Frontenac for the next nine years (1689–1698). Frontenac had arranged a new strategy to weaken the Iroquois. As an act of conciliation, he located the 13 surviving sachems of the 50 originally taken and returned with them to New France in October 1689. In 1690, Frontenac destroyed Schenectady, Kanienkeh and in 1693 burned down three other Mohawk villages and took 300 prisoners.

In 1696, Frontenac decided to take the field against the Iroquois, despite being seventy-six years of age. He decided to target the Oneida and Onondaga, instead of the Mohawk who had been the favorite enemies of the French. On July 6, he left Lachine at the head of a considerable force and traveled to the capital of Onondaga, where he arrived a month later. With support from the French, the Algonquian nations drove the Iroquois out of the territories north of Lake Erie and west of present-day Cleveland, Ohio, regions which they had conquered during the Beaver Wars. In the meantime, the Iroquois had abandoned their villages. As pursuit was impracticable, the French army commenced its return march on August 10. Under Frontenac's leadership, the Canadian militia became increasingly adept at guerrilla warfare, taking the war into Iroquois territory and attacking a number of English settlements. The Iroquois never threatened the French colony again.

During King William's War (North American part of the War of the Grand Alliance), the Iroquois were allied with the English. In July 1701, they concluded the "Nanfan Treaty", deeding the English a large tract north of the Ohio River. The Iroquois claimed to have conquered this territory 80 years earlier. France did not recognize the treaty, as it had settlements in the territory at that time and the English had virtually none. Meanwhile, the Iroquois were negotiating peace with the French; together they signed the Great Peace of Montreal that same year.

French and Indian Wars

After the 1701 peace treaty with the French, the Iroquois remained mostly neutral. During the course of the 17th century, the Iroquois had acquired a fearsome reputation among the Europeans, and it was the policy of the Six Nations to use this reputation to play off the French against the British in order to extract the maximum amount of material rewards. In 1689, the English Crown provided the Six Nations goods worth £100 in exchange for help against the French, in the year 1693 the Iroquois had received goods worth £600, and in the year 1701 the Six Nations had received goods worth £800.

During Queen Anne's War (North American part of the War of the Spanish Succession), they were involved in planned attacks against the French. Peter Schuyler, mayor of Albany, arranged for three Mohawk chiefs and a Mahican chief (known incorrectly as the Four Mohawk Kings) to travel to London in 1710 to meet with Queen Anne in an effort to seal an alliance with the British. Queen Anne was so impressed by her visitors that she commissioned their portraits by court painter John Verelst. The portraits are believed to be the earliest surviving oil portraits of Aboriginal peoples taken from life.

In the early 18th century, the Tuscarora gradually migrated northwards towards Pennsylvania and New York after a bloody conflict with white settlers in North and South Carolina. Due to shared linguistic and cultural similarities, the Tuscarora gradually aligned with the Iroquois and entered the confederacy as the sixth Indian nation in 1722 after being sponsored by the Oneida.

The Iroquois program toward the defeated tribes favored assimilation within the 'Covenant Chain' and Great Law of Peace, over wholesale slaughter. Both the Lenni Lenape, and the Shawnee were briefly tributary to the Six Nations, while subjected Iroquoian populations emerged in the next period as the Mingo, speaking a dialect like that of the Seneca, in the Ohio region. During the War of Spanish Succession, known to Americans as "Queen Anne's War", the Iroquois remained neutral, through leaning towards the British. Anglican missionaries were active with the Iroquois and devised a system of writing for them.

In 1721 and 1722, Lieutenant Governor Alexander Spotswood of Virginia concluded a new Treaty at Albany with the Iroquois, renewing the Covenant Chain and agreeing to recognize the Blue Ridge as the demarcation between the Virginia Colony and the Iroquois. But, as European settlers began to move beyond the Blue Ridge and into the Shenandoah Valley in the 1730s, the Iroquois objected. Virginia officials told them that the demarcation was to prevent the Iroquois from trespassing east of the Blue Ridge, but it did not prevent English from expanding west. Tensions increased over the next decades, and the Iroquois were on the verge of going to war with the Virginia Colony. In 1743, Governor Sir William Gooch paid them the sum of 100 pounds sterling for any settled land in the Valley that was claimed by the Iroquois. The following year at the Treaty of Lancaster, the Iroquois sold Virginia all their remaining claims in the Shenandoah Valley for 200 pounds in gold.

During the French and Indian War (the North American theater of the Seven Years' War), the League Iroquois sided with the British against the French and their Algonquian allies, who were traditional enemies. The Iroquois hoped that aiding the British would also bring favors after the war. Few Iroquois warriors joined the campaign. By contrast, the Canadian Iroquois supported the French.

In 1711, refugees from is now southern-western Germany known as the Palatines appealed to the Iroquois clan mothers for permission to settle on their land. By spring of 1713, about 150 Palatine families had leased land from the Iroquois. The Iroquois taught the Palatines how to grow "the Three Sisters" as they called their staple crops of beans, corn and squash and where to find edible nuts, roots and berries. In return, the Palatines taught the Iroquois how to grow wheat and oats, and how to use iron ploughs and hoes to farm. As a result of the money earned from land rented to the Palatines, the Iroquois elite gave up living in longhouses and started living in European style houses, having an income equal to a middle-class English family. By the middle of the 18th century, a multi-cultural world had emerged with the Iroquois living alongside German and Scots-Irish settlers. The settlements of the Palatines were intermixed with the Iroquois villages. In 1738, an Irishman, Sir William Johnson, who was successful as a fur trader, settled with the Iroquois. Johnson who become very rich from the fur trade and land speculation, learned the languages of the Iroquois and become the main intermediary between the British and the League. In 1745, Johnson was appointed the Northern superintendent of Indian Affairs, formalizing his position.

On July 9, 1755, a force of British Army regulars and the Virginia militia under General Edward Braddock advancing into the Ohio river valley was almost completely destroyed by the French and their Indian allies at the Battle of the Monongahela. Johnson, who had the task of enlisting the League Iroquois on the British side, led a mixed Anglo-Iroquois force to victory at Lac du St Sacrement, known to the British as Lake George. In the Battle of Lake George, a group of Catholic Mohawk (from Kahnawake) and French forces ambushed a Mohawk-led British column; the Mohawk were deeply disturbed as they had created their confederacy for peace among the peoples and had not had warfare against each other. Johnson attempted to ambush a force of 1,000 French troops and 700 Canadian Iroquois under the command of Baron Dieskau, who beat off the attack and killed the old Mohawk war chief, Peter Hendricks. On September 8, 1755, Diskau attacked Johnson's camp, but was repulsed with heavy losses. Though the Battle of Lake George was a British victory, the heavy losses taken by the Mohawk and Oneida at the battle caused the League to declare neutrality in the war. Despite Johnson's best efforts, the League Iroquois remained neutral for next several years, and a series of French victories at Oswego, Louisbourg, Fort William Henry and Fort Carillon ensured the League Iroquois would not fight on what appeared to be the losing side.

In February 1756, the French learned from a spy, Oratory, an Oneida chief, that the British were stockpiling supplies at the Oneida Carrying Place, a crucial portage between Albany and Oswego to support an offensive in the spring into what is now Ontario. As the frozen waters melted south of Lake Ontario on average two weeks before the waters did north of Lake Ontario, the British would be able to move against the French bases at Fort Frontenac and Fort Niagara before the French forces in Montreal could come to their relief, which from the French perspective necessitated a preemptive strike at the Oneida Carrying Place in the winter. To carry out this strike, the Marquis de Vaudreuil, the Governor-General of New France, assigned the task to Gaspard-Joseph Chaussegros de Léry, an officer of the troupes de le Marine, who required and received the assistance of the Canadian Iroquois to guide him to the Oneida Carrying Place. The Canadian Iroquois joined the expedition, which left Montreal on February 29, 1756 on the understanding that they would only fight against the British, not the League Iroquois, and they would not be assaulting a fort.

On March 13, 1756, an Oswegatchie Indian traveler informed the expedition that the British had built two forts at the Oneida Carrying Place, which caused the majority of the Canadian Iroquois to want to turn back, as they argued the risks of assaulting a fort would mean too many casualties, and many did in fact abandon the expedition. On March 26, 1756, Léry's force of troupes de le Marine and French-Canadian militiamen, who had not eaten for two days, received much needed food when the Canadian Iroquois ambushed a British wagon train bringing supplies to Fort William and Fort Bull. As far as the Canadian Iroquois were concerned, the raid was a success as they captured 9 wagons full of supplies and took 10 prisoners without losing a man, and for them, engaging in a frontal attack against the two wooden forts as Léry wanted to do was irrational. The Canadian Iroquois informed Léry "if I absolutely wanted to die, I was the master of the French, but they were not going to follow me". In the end, about 30 Canadian Iroquois reluctantly joined Léry's attack on Fort Bull on the morning of March 27, 1756, when the French and their Indian allies stormed the fort, finally smashing their way in through the main gate with a battering ram at noon. Of the 63 people in Fort Bull, half of whom were civilians, only 3 soldiers, one carpenter and one woman survived the Battle of Fort Bull as Léry reported "I could not restrain the ardor of the soldiers and the Canadians. They killed everyone they encountered". Afterwards, the French destroyed all of the British supplies and Fort Bull itself, which secured the western flank of New France. On the same day, the main force of the Canadian Iroquois ambushed a relief force from Fort William coming to the aid of Fort Bull, and did not slaughter their prisoners as the French did at Fort Bull; for the Iroquois, prisoners were very valuable as they increased the size of the tribe.

The crucial difference between the European and First Nations way of war was that Europe had millions of people, which meant that British and French generals were willing to see thousands of their own men die in battle in order to secure victory as their losses could always be made good; by contrast, the Iroquois had a considerably smaller population, and could not afford heavy losses, which could cripple a community. The Iroquois custom of "Mourning wars" to take captives who would become Iroquois reflected the continual need for more people in the Iroquois communities. Iroquois warriors were brave, but would only fight to the death if necessary, usually to protect their women and children; otherwise, the crucial concern for Iroquois chiefs was always to save manpower. The Canadian historian D. Peter MacLeod wrote that the Iroquois way of war was based on their hunting philosophy, where a successful hunter would bring down an animal efficiently without taking any losses to his hunting party, and in the same way, a successful war leader would inflict losses on the enemy without taking any losses in return.

The Iroquois only entered the war on the British side again in late 1758 after the British took Louisbourg and Fort Frontenac. At the Treaty of Fort Easton in October 1758, the Iroquois forced the Lenape and Shawnee who had been fighting for the French to declare neutrality. In July 1759, the Iroquois helped Johnson take Fort Niagara. In the ensuing campaign, the League Iroquois assisted General Jeffrey Amherst as he took various French forts by the Great Lakes and the St. Lawrence valley as he advanced towards Montreal, which he took in September 1760. The British historian Michael Johnson wrote the Iroquois had "played a major supporting role" in the final British victory in the Seven Years' War. In 1763, Johnson left his old home of Fort Johnson for the lavish estate, which he called Johnson Hall, which become a center of social life in the region. Johnson was close to two white families, the Butlers and the Croghans, and three Mohawk families, the Brants, the Hills, and the Peters.

After the war, to protect their alliance, the British government issued the Royal Proclamation of 1763, forbidding white settlement beyond the Appalachian Mountains. American colonists largely ignored the order, and the British had insufficient soldiers to enforce it.

Faced with confrontations, the Iroquois agreed to adjust the line again in the Treaty of Fort Stanwix (1768). Sir William Johnson, 1st Baronet, British Superintendent of Indian Affairs for the Northern District, had called the Iroquois nations together in a grand conference in western New York, which a total of 3,102 Indians attended. They had long had good relations with Johnson, who had traded with them and learned their languages and customs. As Alan Taylor noted in his history, The Divided Ground: Indians, Settlers, and the Northern Borderland of the American Revolution (2006), the Iroquois were creative and strategic thinkers. They chose to sell to the British Crown all their remaining claim to the lands between the Ohio and Tennessee rivers, which they did not occupy, hoping by doing so to draw off English pressure on their territories in the Province of New York.

American Revolution

During the American Revolution, the Iroquois first tried to stay neutral. The Reverend Samuel Kirkland, a Congregational minister working as a missionary, pressured the Oneida and the Tuscarora for a pro-American neutrality while Guy Johnson and his cousin John Johnson pressured the Mohawk, the Cayuga and the Seneca to fight for the British. Pressed to join one side or the other, the Tuscarora and the Oneida sided with the colonists, while the Mohawk, Seneca, Onondaga, and Cayuga remained loyal to Great Britain, with whom they had stronger relationships. Joseph Louis Cook offered his services to the United States and received a Congressional commission as a lieutenant colonel—the highest rank held by any Native American during the war. The Mohawk war chief Joseph Brant together with John Butler and John Johnson raised racially mixed forces of irregulars to fight for the Crown. Molly Brant had been the common-law wife of Sir William Johnson, and it was through her patronage that her brother Joseph came to be a war chief.

The Mohawk war chief Joseph Brant, other war chiefs, and British allies conducted numerous operations against frontier settlements in the Mohawk Valley, including the Cherry Valley massacre, destroying many villages and crops, and killing and capturing inhabitants. The destructive raids by Brant and other Loyalists led to appeals to Congress for help. The Continentals retaliated and in 1779, George Washington ordered the Sullivan Campaign, led by Col. Daniel Brodhead and General John Sullivan, against the Iroquois nations to "not merely overrun, but destroy", the British-Indian alliance. They burned many Iroquois villages and stores throughout western New York; refugees moved north to Canada. By the end of the war, few houses and barns in the valley had survived the warfare. In the aftermath of the Sullivan expedition, Brant visited Quebec City to ask General Sir Frederick Haildmand for assurances that the Mohawk and the other Loyalist Iroquois would receive a new homeland in Canada as compensation for their loyalty to the Crown if the British should lose.

The American Revolution caused a great divide between the colonists between Patriots and Loyalists and a large proportion (30-35%) who were neutral; it caused a divide between the colonies and Great Britain, and it also caused a rift that would break the Iroquois Confederacy. At the onset of the Revolution, the Iroquois Confederacy's Six Nations attempted to take a stance of neutrality. However, almost inevitably, the Iroquois nations eventually had to take sides in the conflict. It is easy to see how the American Revolution would have caused conflict and confusion among the Six Nations. For years they had been used to thinking about the English and their colonists as one and the same people. In the American Revolution, the Iroquois Confederacy now had to deal with relationships between two governments.

The Iroquois Confederation's population had changed significantly since the arrival of Europeans. Disease had reduced their population to a fraction of what it had been in the past. Therefore, it was in their best interest to be on the good side of whoever would prove to be the winning side in the war, for the winning side would dictate how future relationships would be with the Iroquois in North America. Dealing with two governments made it hard to maintain a neutral stance, because the governments could get jealous easily if the Confederacy was interacting or trading more with one side over the other, or even if there was simply a perception of favoritism. Because of this challenging situation, the Six Nations had to choose sides. The Oneida and Tuscarora decided to support the American colonists, while the rest of the Iroquois League (the Cayuga, Mohawk, Onondaga, and Seneca) sided with the British and their Loyalists among the colonists.

There were many reasons that the Six Nations could not remain neutral and uninvolved in the Revolutionary War. One of these is simple proximity; the Iroquois Confederacy was too close to the action of the war to not be involved. The Six Nations were very discontented with the encroachment of the English and their colonists upon their land. They were particularly concerned with the border established in the Proclamation of 1763 and the Treaty of Fort Stanwix in 1768.

During the American Revolution, the authority of the British government over the frontier was hotly contested. The colonists tried to take advantage of this as much as possible by seeking their own profit and claiming new land. In 1775, the Six Nations were still neutral when "a Mohawk person was killed by a Continental soldier". Such a case shows how the Six Nations' proximity to the war drew them into it. They were concerned about being killed, and about their lands being taken from them. They could not show weakness and simply let the colonists and British do whatever they wanted. Many of the English and colonists did not respect the treaties made in the past. "A number of His Majesty's subjects in the American colonies viewed the proclamation as a temporary prohibition which would soon give way to the opening of the area for settlement ... and that it was simply an agreement to quiet the minds of the Indians". The Six Nations had to take a stand to show that they would not accept such treatment, and they looked to build a relationship with a government that would respect their territory.

In addition to being in close proximity to the war, the new lifestyle and economics of the Iroquois Confederacy since the arrival of the Europeans in North America made it nearly impossible for the Iroquois to isolate themselves from the conflict. By this time, the Iroquois had become dependent upon the trade of goods from the English and colonists and had adopted many European customs, tools, and weapons. For example, they were increasingly dependent on firearms for hunting. After becoming so reliant, it would have been hard to even consider cutting off trade that brought goods that were a central part of everyday life.

As Barbara Graymont stated, "Their task was an impossible one to maintain neutrality. Their economies and lives had become so dependent on each other for trading goods and benefits it was impossible to ignore the conflict. Meanwhile, they had to try and balance their interactions with both groups. They did not want to seem as they were favoring one group over the other, because of sparking jealousy and suspicion from either side". Furthermore, the English had made many agreements with the Six Nations over the years, yet most of the Iroquois' day-to-day interaction had been with the colonists. This made it a confusing situation for the Iroquois because they could not tell who the true heirs of the agreement were, and couldn't know if agreements with England would continue to be honored by the colonists if they were to win independence.

Supporting either side in the Revolutionary War was a complicated decision. Each nation individually weighed their options to come up with a final stance that ultimately broke neutrality and ended the collective agreement of the Confederation. The British were clearly the most organized, and seemingly most powerful. In many cases, the British presented the situation to the Iroquois as the colonists just being "naughty children". On the other, the Iroquois considered that "the British government was three thousand miles away. This placed them at a disadvantage in attempting to enforce both the Proclamation of 1763 and the Treaty at Fort Stanwix 1768 against land hungry frontiersmen." In other words, even though the British were the strongest and best organized faction, the Six Nations had concerns about whether they would truly be able to enforce their agreements from so far away.

The Iroquois also had concerns about the colonists. The British asked for Iroquois support in the war. "In 1775, the Continental Congress sent a delegation to the Iroquois in Albany to ask for their neutrality in the war coming against the British". It had been clear in prior years that the colonists had not been respectful of the land agreements made in 1763 and 1768. The Iroquois Confederacy was particularly concerned over the possibility of the colonists winning the war, for if a revolutionary victory were to occur, the Iroquois very much saw it as the precursor to their lands being taken away by the victorious colonists, who would no longer have the British Crown to restrain them. Continental army officers such as George Washington had attempted to destroy the Iroquois.

On a contrasting note, it was the colonists who had formed the most direct relationships with the Iroquois due to their proximity and trade ties. For the most part, the colonists and Iroquois had lived in relative peace since the English arrival on the continent a century and a half before. The Iroquois had to determine whether their relationships with the colonists were reliable, or whether the English would prove to better serve their interests. They also had to determine whether there were really any differences between how the English and the colonists would treat them.

The war ensued, and the Iroquois broke their confederation. Hundreds of years of precedent and collective government was trumped by the immensity of the American Revolutionary War. The Oneida and Tuscarora decided to support the colonists, while the rest of the Iroquois League (the Cayuga, Mohawk, Onondaga, and Seneca) sided with the British and Loyalists. At the conclusion of the war the fear that the colonists would not respect the Iroquois' pleas came true, especially after the majority of the Six Nations decided to side with the British and were no longer considered trustworthy by the newly independent Americans. In 1783 the Treaty of Paris was signed. While the treaty included peace agreements between all of the European nations involved in the war as well as the newborn United States, it made no provisions for the Iroquois, who were left to be treated with by the new United States government as it saw fit.

Post-war
After the Revolutionary War, the ancient central fireplace of the League was re-established at Buffalo Creek. The United States and the Iroquois signed the Treaty of Fort Stanwix in 1784, under which the Iroquois ceded much of their historical homeland to the Americans, which was followed by another treaty in 1794 at Canandaigua which they ceded even more land to the Americans. The governor of New York state, George Clinton, was constantly pressuring the Iroquois to sell their land to white settlers, and as alcoholism became a major problem in the Iroquois communities, many did sell their land in order to buy more alcohol, usually to unscrupulous agents of land companies. At the same time, American settlers continued to push into the lands beyond the Ohio river, leading to a war between the Western Confederacy and the United States. One of the Iroquois chiefs, Cornplanter, persuaded the remaining Iroquois in New York state to remain neutral and not to join the Western Confederacy. At the same time, American policies to make the Iroquois more settled started to have some effect. Traditionally, for the Iroquois farming was woman's work and hunting was men's work; by the early 19th century, American policies to have the men farm the land and cease hunting were having effect. During this time, the Iroquois living in New York state become demoralized as more of their land was sold to land speculators while alcoholism, violence, and broken families became major problems on their reservations. The Oneida and the Cayuga sold almost all of their land and moved out of their traditional homelands.

By 1811, Methodist and Episcopalian missionaries established missions to assist the Oneida and Onondaga in western New York. However, white settlers continued to move into the area. By 1821, a group of Oneida led by Eleazar Williams, son of a Mohawk woman, went to Wisconsin to buy land from the Menominee and Ho-Chunk and thus move their people further westward. In 1838, the Holland Land Company used forged documents to cheat the Seneca of almost all of their land in western New York, but a Quaker missionary, Asher Wright, launched lawsuits that led to one of the Seneca reservations being returned in 1842 and another in 1857. However, as late as the 1950s both the United States and New York governments confiscated land belonging to the Six Nations for roads, dams and reservoirs with the land being given to Cornplanter for keeping the Iroquois from joining the Western Confederacy in the 1790s being forcibly purchased by eminent domain and flooded for the Kinzua Dam. 
 
Captain Joseph Brant and a group of Iroquois left New York to settle in the Province of Quebec (present-day Ontario). To partially replace the lands they had lost in the Mohawk Valley and elsewhere because of their fateful alliance with the British Crown, the Haldimand Proclamation gave them a large land grant on the Grand River, at Six Nations of the Grand River First Nation. Brant's crossing of the river gave the original name to the area: Brant's Ford. By 1847, European settlers began to settle nearby and named the village Brantford. The original Mohawk settlement was on the south edge of the present-day Canadian city at a location still favorable for launching and landing canoes. In the 1830s many additional Onondaga, Oneida, Seneca, Cayuga, and Tuscarora relocated into the Indian Territory, the Province of Upper Canada, and Wisconsin.

In the west
Many Iroquois (mostly Mohawk) and Iroquois-descended Métis people living in Lower Canada (primarily at Kahnawake) took employment with the Montreal-based North West Company during its existence from 1779 to 1821 and became voyageurs or free traders working in the North American fur trade as far west as the Rocky Mountains. They are known to have settled in the area around Jasper's House and possibly as far west as the Finlay River and north as far as the Pouce Coupe and Dunvegan areas, where they founded new Aboriginal communities which have persisted to the present day claiming either First Nations or Métis identity and indigenous rights. The Michel Band, Mountain Métis, and Aseniwuche Winewak Nation of Canada in Alberta and the Kelly Lake community in British Columbia all claim Iroquois ancestry.

Canadian Iroquois
During the 18th century, the Catholic Canadian Iroquois living outside of Montreal reestablished ties with the League Iroquois. During the American Revolution, the Canadian Iroquois declared their neutrality and refused to fight for the Crown despite the offers of Sir Guy Carleton, the governor of Quebec. Many Canadian Iroquois worked for both the Hudson's Bay Company and the Northwest Company as voyageurs in the fur trade in the late 18th and early 19th centuries. In the War of 1812, the Canadian Iroquois again declared their neutrality. The Canadian Iroquois communities at Oka and Kahnaweke were prosperous settlements in the 19th century, supporting themselves via farming and the sale of sleds, snowshoes, boats, and baskets. In 1884, about 100 Canadian Iroquois were hired by the British government to serve as river pilots and boatmen for the relief expedition for the besieged General Charles Gordon in Khartoum in the Sudan, taking the force commanded by Field Marshal Wolsely up the Nile from Cairo to Khartoum. On their way back to Canada, the Canadian Iroquois river pilots and boatmen stopped in London, where they were personally thanked by Queen Victoria for their services to Queen and Country. In 1886, when a bridge was being built at the St. Lawrence, a number of Iroquois men from Kahnawke were hired to help built and the Iroquois workers proved so skilled as steelwork erectors that since that time, a number of bridges and skycrapers in Canada and the United States have been built by the Iroquois steelmen.

20th century

World War I 
During World War I, it was Canadian policy to encourage men from the First Nations to enlist in the Canadian Expeditionary Force (CEF), where their skills at hunting made them excellent as snipers and scouts. As the Iroquois Six Nations were considered the most warlike of Canada's First Nations, and, in turn, the Mohawk the most warlike of the Six Nations, the Canadian government especially encouraged the Iroquois, particularly the Mohawks, to join. About half of the 4,000 or so First Nations men who served in the CEF were Iroquois. Men from the Six Nations reservation at Brantford were encouraged to join the 114th Haldimand Battalion (also known as "Brock's Rangers) of the CEF, where two entire companies including the officers were all Iroquois. The 114th Battalion was formed in December 1915 and broken up in November 1916 to provide reinforcements for other battalions. A Mohawk from Brantford, William Forster Lickers, who enlisted in the CEF in September 1914 was captured at the Second Battle of Ypres in April 1915, where he was savagely beaten by his captors as one German officer wanted to see if "Indians could feel pain". Lickers was beaten so badly that he was left paralyzed for the rest of his life, though the officer was well pleased to establish that Indians did indeed feel pain.

The Six Nations council at Brantford tended to see themselves as a sovereign nation that was allied to the Crown through the Covenant Chain going back to the 17th century and thus allied to King George V personally instead of being under the authority of Canada. One Iroquois clan mother in a letter sent in August 1916 to a recruiting sergeant who refused to allow her teenage son to join the CEF under the grounds that he was underage, declared the Six Nations were not subject to the laws of Canada and he had no right to refuse her son because Canadian laws did not apply to them. As she explained, the Iroquois regarded the Covenant Chain as still being in effect, meaning the Iroquois were only fighting in the war in response to an appeal for help from their ally, King George V, who had asked them to enlist in the CEF.

League of Nations 
The complex political environment which emerged in Canada with the Haudenosaunee grew out of the Anglo-American era of European colonization. At the end of the War of 1812, Britain shifted Indian affairs from the military to civilian control. With the creation of the Canadian Confederation in 1867, civil authority, and thus Indian affairs, passed to Canadian officials with Britain retaining control of military and security matters. At the turn of the century, the Canadian government began passing a series of Acts which were strenuously objected to by the Iroquois Confederacy. During World War I, an act attempted to conscript Six Nations men for military service. Under the Soldiers Resettlement Act, legislation was introduced to redistribute native land. Finally in 1920, an Act was proposed to force citizenship on "Indians" with or without their consent, which would then automatically remove their share of any tribal lands from tribal trust and make the land and the person subject to the laws of Canada.

The Haudenosaunee hired a lawyer to defend their rights in the Supreme Court of Canada. The Supreme Court refused to take the case, declaring that the members of the Six Nations were British citizens. In effect, as Canada was at the time a division of the British government, it was not an international state, as defined by international law. In contrast, the Iroquois Confederacy had been making treaties and functioning as a state since 1643 and all of their treaties had been negotiated with Britain, not Canada. As a result, a decision was made in 1921 to send a delegation to petition the King George V, whereupon Canada's External Affairs division blocked issuing passports. In response, the Iroquois began issuing their own passports and sent Levi General, the Cayuga Chief "Deskaheh," to England with their attorney. Winston Churchill dismissed their complaint claiming that it was within the realm of Canadian jurisdiction and referred them back to Canadian officials.

On December 4, 1922, Charles Stewart, Superintendent of Indian Affairs, and Duncan Campbell Scott, Deputy Superintendent of the Canadian Department of Indian Affairs traveled to Brantford to negotiate a settlement on the issues with the Six Nations. After the meeting, the Native delegation brought the offer to the tribal council, as was customary under Haudenosaunee law. The council agreed to accept the offer, but before they could respond, the Royal Canadian Mounted Police conducted a liquor raid on the Iroquois' Grand River territory. The siege lasted three days and prompted the Haudenosaunee to send Deskaheh to Washington, D/C., to meet with the chargé d'affaires of the Netherlands asking the Dutch Queen to sponsor them for membership in the League of Nations. Under pressure from the British, the Netherlands reluctantly refused sponsorship.

Deskaheh and the tribal attorney proceeded to Geneva and attempted to gather support. "On 27 September 1923, delegates representing Estonia, Ireland, Panama and Persia signed a letter asking for communication of the Six Nations' petition to the League's assembly," but the effort was blocked. Six Nations delegates traveled to the Hague and back to Geneva attempting to gain supporters and recognition, while back in Canada, the government was drafting a mandate to replace the traditional Haudenosaunee Confederacy Council with one that would be elected under the auspices of the Canadian Indian Act. In an unpublicized signing on September 17, 1924, Prime Minister Mackenzie King and Governor-General Lord Byng of Vimy signed the Order in Council, which set elections on the Six Nations reserve for October 21. Only 26 ballots were cast.

The long-term effect of the Order was that the Canadian government had wrested control over the Haudenosaunee trust funds from the Iroquois Confederation and decades of litigation would follow. In 1979, over 300 Indian chiefs visited London to oppose Patriation of the Canadian Constitution, fearing that their rights to be recognized in the Royal Proclamation of 1763 would be jeopardized. In 1981, hoping again to clarify that judicial responsibilities of treaties signed with Britain were not transferred to Canada, several Alberta Indian chiefs filed a petition with the British High Court of Justice. They lost the case but gained an invitation from the Canadian government to participate in the constitutional discussions which dealt with protection of treaty rights.

Oka Crisis 

In 1990, a long-running dispute over ownership of land at Oka, Quebec, caused a violent stand-off. The Mohawk reservation at Oka had become dominated by a group called the Mohawk Warrior Society that engaged in practices that American and Canadian authorities considered smuggling across the U.S.-Canada border, and were well armed with assault rifles. On July 11, 1990, the Mohawk Warrior Society tried to stop the building of a golf course on land claimed by the Mohawk people, which led to a shoot-out between the Warrior Society and the Sûreté du Québec that left a policeman dead. In the resulting Oka Crisis, the Warrior Society occupied both the land that they claimed belonged to the Mohawk people and the Mercier bridge linking the Island of Montreal to the south shore of the St. Lawrence River. On August 17, 1990, Quebec Premier Robert Bourassa asked for the Canadian Army to intervene to maintain "public safety", leading to the deployment of the Royal 22e Régiment to Oka and Montreal. The stand-off ended on September 26, 1990, with a melee between the soldiers and the warriors. The dispute over ownership of the land at Oka continues.

U.S. Indian termination policies 

In the period between World War II and The Sixties, the U.S. government followed a policy of Indian Termination for its Native citizens. In a series of laws, attempting to mainstream tribal people into the greater society, the government strove to end the U.S. government's recognition of tribal sovereignty, eliminate trusteeship over Indian reservations, and implement state law applicability to native persons. In general, the laws were expected to create taxpaying citizens, subject to state and federal taxes as well as laws, from which Native people had previously been exempt.

On August 13, 1946 the Indian Claims Commission Act of 1946, Pub. L. No. 79-726, ch. 959, was passed. Its purpose was to settle for all time any outstanding grievances or claims the tribes might have against the U.S. for treaty breaches, unauthorized taking of land, dishonorable or unfair dealings, or inadequate compensation. Claims had to be filed within a five-year period, and most of the 370 complaints that were submitted were filed at the approach of the five-year deadline in August 1951.

On July 2, 1948 Congress enacted [Public Law 881] 62 Stat. 1224, which transferred criminal jurisdiction over offenses committed by and against "Indians" to the State of New York. It covered all reservations' lands within the state and prohibited the deprivation of hunting and fishing rights which may have been guaranteed to "any Indian tribe, band, or community, or members thereof." It further prohibited the state from requiring tribal members to obtain fish and game licenses. Within 2 years, Congress passed [Public Law 785] 64 Stat. 845, on September 13, 1950 which extended New York's authority to civil disputes between Indians or Indians and others within the State. It allowed the tribes to preserve customs, prohibited taxation on reservations, and reaffirmed hunting and fishing rights. It also prohibited the state from enforcing judgments regarding any land disputes or applying any State laws to tribal lands or claims prior to the effective date of the law September 13, 1952. During congressional hearings on the law, tribes strongly opposed its passage, fearful that states would deprive them of their reservations. The State of New York disavowed any intention to break up or deprive tribes of their reservations and asserted that they did not have the ability to do so.

On August 1, 1953, United States Congress issued a formal statement, House Concurrent Resolution 108, which was the formal policy presentation announcing the official federal policy of Indian termination. The resolution called for the "immediate termination of the Flathead, Klamath, Menominee, Potawatomi, and Turtle Mountain Chippewa, as well as all tribes in the states of California, New York, Florida, and Texas." All federal aid, services, and protection offered to these Native peoples were to cease, and the federal trust relationship and management of reservations would end. Individual members of terminated tribes were to become full United States citizens with all the rights, benefits and responsibilities of any other United States citizen. The resolution also called for the Interior Department to quickly identify other tribes who would be ready for termination in the near future.

Beginning in 1953, a Federal task force began meeting with the tribes of the Six Nations. Despite tribal objections, legislation was introduced into Congress for termination. The proposed legislation involved more than 11,000 Indians of the Iroquois Confederation and was divided into two separate bills. One bill dealt with the Mohawk, Oneida, Onondaga, Cayuga and Tuscarora tribes, and the other dealt with the Seneca. The arguments the Six Nations made in their hearings with committees were that their treaties showed that the United States recognized that their lands belonged to the Six Nations, not the United States, and that "termination contradicted any reasonable interpretation that their lands would not be claimed or their nations disturbed" by the federal government. The bill for the Iroquois Confederation died in committee without further serious consideration.

On August 31, 1964, H. R. 1794 An Act to authorize payment for certain interests in lands within the Allegheny Indian Reservation in New York was passed by Congress and sent to the president for signature. The bill authorized payment for resettling and rehabilitation of the Seneca Indians who were being dislocated by the construction of the Kinzua Dam on the Allegheny River. Though only 127 Seneca families (about 500 people) were being dislocated, the legislation benefited the entire Seneca Nation, because the taking of the Indian land for the dam abridged a 1794 treaty agreement. In addition, the bill provided that within three years, a plan from the Interior Secretary should be submitted to Congress withdrawing all federal supervision over the Seneca Nation, though technically civil and criminal jurisdiction had lain with the State of New York since 1950.

Accordingly, on September 5, 1967 a memo from the Department of the Interior announced proposed legislation was being submitted to end federal ties with the Seneca. In 1968 a new liaison was appointed from the BIA for the tribe to assist the tribe in preparing for termination and rehabilitation. The Seneca were able to hold off termination until President Nixon issued his Special Message to the Congress on Indian Affairs in July 1970. No New York tribes then living in the state were terminated during this period.

One tribe that had formerly lived in New York did lose its federal recognition. The Emigrant Indians of New York included the Oneida, Stockbridge-Munsee, and Brothertown Indians of Wisconsin. In an effort to fight termination and force the government into recognizing their outstanding land claims in New York, the three tribes filed litigation with the Claims Commission in the 1950s. They won their claim on August 11, 1964. Public Law 90-93 81 Stat. 229 Emigrant New York Indians of Wisconsin Judgment Act established federal trusteeship to pay the Oneida and Stockbridge-Munsee, effectively ending Congressional termination efforts for them. Though the law did not specifically state the Brothertown Indians were terminated, it authorized all payments to be made directly to each enrollee, with special provisions for minors to be handled by the Secretary. The payments were not subject to state or federal taxes.

Beginning in 1978, the Brothertown Indians submitted a petition to regain federal recognition. In 2012 the Department of the Interior, in the final determination on the Brothertown petition, found that Congress had terminated their tribal status when it granted them citizenship in 1838 and therefore only Congress could restore their tribal status. They are still seeking Congressional approval.

Society

War
For the Haudenosaunee, grief for a loved one who died was a powerful emotion. They believed that if it was not attended to, it would cause all sorts of problems for the grieving who would go mad if left without consolation. Rituals to honor the dead were very important and the most important of all was the condolence ceremony to provide consolation for those who lost a family member or friend. Since it was believed that the death of a family member also weakened the spiritual strength of the surviving family members, it was considered crucially important to replace the lost family member by providing a substitute who could be adopted, or alternatively could be tortured to provide an outlet for the grief. Hence the "mourning wars".

One of the central features of traditional Iroquois life were the "mourning wars", when their warriors would raid neighboring peoples in search of captives to replace those Haudenosaunee who had died. War for the Haudenosaunee was primarily undertaken for captives. They were not concerned with such goals as expansion of territory or glory in battle, as were the Europeans. They did, however, go to war to control hunting grounds, especially as the fur trade became more lucrative.

A war party was considered successful if it took many prisoners without suffering losses in return; killing enemies was considered acceptable if necessary, but disapproved of as it reduced the number of potential captives. Taking captives were considered far more important than scalps. Additionally, war served as a way for young men to demonstrate their valor and courage. This was a prerequisite for a man to be made a chief, and it was also essential for men who wanted to marry. Haudenosaunee women admired warriors who were brave in war. In the pre-contact era, war was relativity bloodless, as First Nations peoples did not have guns and fought one another in suits of wooden armor. In 1609, the French explorer Samuel de Champlain observed several battles between the Algonquin and the Iroquois that resulted in hardly any deaths. This seemed to be the norm for First Nations wars. At a battle between the Algonquin and the Iroquois by the shores of Lake Champlain, the only people killed were two Iroquois warriors hit by bullets from Champlain's musket, in a demonstration to his Algonquin allies.

The clan mothers would demand a "mourning war" to provide consolation and renewed spiritual strength for a family that lost a member to death. Either the warriors would go on a "mourning war" or would be marked by the clan mothers as cowards forever, which made them unmarriageable. At this point, the warriors would usually leave to raid a neighboring people in search of captives. The captives were either adopted into Haudenosaunee families to become assimilated, or were to be killed after bouts of ritualized torture as a way of expressing rage at the death of a family member. The male captives were usually received with blows, passing through a kind of gantlet as they were brought into the community. All captives, regardless of their sex or age, were stripped naked and tied to poles in the middle of the community. After having sensitive parts of their bodies burned and some of their fingernails pulled out, the prisoners were allowed to rest and given food and water. In the following days, the captives had to dance naked before the community, when individual families decided for each if the person was to be adopted or killed. Women and children were more often adopted than were older men. If those who were adopted into the Haudenosaunee families made a sincere effort to become Haudenosaunee, then they would be embraced by the community, and if they did not, then they were swiftly executed.

Those slated for execution had to wear red and black facial paint and were "adopted" by a family who addressed the prisoner as "uncle", "aunt", "nephew" or "niece" depending on their age and sex, and would bring them food and water. The captive would be executed after a day-long torture session of burning and removing body parts, which the prisoner was expected to bear with stoicism and nobility (an expectation not usually met) before being scalped alive. Hot sand was applied to the exposed skull and they were finally killed by cutting out their hearts. Afterward, the victim's body was cut and eaten by the community. The practice of ritual torture and execution, together with cannibalism, ended some time in the early 18th century. By the late-18th-century, European writers such as Philip Mazzei and James Adair were denying that the Haudenosaunee engaged in ritual torture and cannibalism, saying they had seen no evidence of such practices during their visits to Haudenosaunee villages.

In 1711 Onondaga chief Teganissorens told Sir Robert Hunter, governor of New York: "We are not like you Christians, for when you have prisoners of one another you send them home, by such means you can never rout one another". The converse of this strategy was that the Iroquois would not accept losses in battle, as it defeated the whole purpose of the "mourning wars", which was to add to their numbers, not decrease them. The French during their wars with the Haudenosaunee were often astonished when a war party that was on the verge of victory over them could be made to retreat by killing one or two of their number. The European notion of a glorious death in battle had no counterpart with the Haudenosaunee.

Death in battle was accepted only when absolutely necessary, and the Iroquois believed the souls of those who died in battle were destined to spend eternity as angry ghosts haunting the world in search of vengeance. For this reason, those who died in battle were never buried in community cemeteries, as it would bring the presence of unhappy ghosts into the community.

The Haudenosaunee engaged in tactics that the French, the British, and the Americans all considered to be cowardly, until the Americans adopted similar guerrilla tactics. The Haudenosaunee preferred ambushes and surprise attacks, would almost never attack a fortified place or attack frontally, and would retreat if outnumbered. If Kanienkeh was invaded, the Haudenosaunee would attempt to ambush the enemy, or alternatively they would retreat behind the wooden walls of their villages to endure a siege. If the enemy appeared too powerful, as when the French invaded Kanienkeh in 1693, the Haudenosaunee burned their villages and their crops, and the entire population retreated into the woods to wait for the French to depart. The main weapons for the Iroquois were bows and arrows with flint tips and quivers made from corn husks. Shields and war clubs were made from wood. After contact was established with Europeans, the Native Americans adopted such tools as metal knives and hatchets, and made their tomahawks with iron or steel blades. It has been posited that the tomahawk was not used extensively in battle, but instead became associated with the Haudenosaunee through European depictions that sought to portray natives as savage and threatening. Before taking to the field, war chiefs would lead ritual purification ceremonies in which the warriors would dance around a pole painted red.

European infectious diseases such as smallpox devastated the Five Nations in the 17th century, causing thousands of deaths, as they had no acquired immunity to the new diseases, which had been endemic among Europeans for centuries. The League began a period of "mourning wars" without precedent; compounding deaths from disease, they nearly annihilated the Huron, Petun and Neutral peoples. By the 1640s, it is estimated that smallpox had reduced the population of the Haudenosaunee by least 50%. Massive "mourning wars" were undertaken to make up these losses. The American historian Daniel Richter wrote it was at this point that war changed from being sporadic, small-scale raids launched in response to individual deaths, and became "the constant and increasing undifferentiated symptom of societies in demographic crisis". The introduction of guns, which could pierce the wooden armor, made First Nations warfare bloodier and more deadly than it had been in the pre-contact era. This ended the age when armed conflicts were more brawls than battles as Europeans would have understood the term. At the same time, guns could only be obtained by trading furs with the Europeans. Once the Haudenosaunee exhausted their supplies of beaver by about 1640, they were forced to buy beaver pelts from Indians living further north, which led them to attempt to eliminate other middlemen in order to monopolize the fur trade in a series of "beaver wars". Richter wrote 
"the mourning war tradition, deaths from disease, dependence on firearms, and the trade in furs combined to produce a dangerous spiral: epidemics led to deadlier mourning wars fought with firearms; the need for guns increased the need for pelts to trade for them; the quest for furs provoked wars with other nations; and deaths in those wars began the mourning war cycle anew".From 1640 to 1701, the Five Nations was almost continuously at war, battling at various times the French, Huron, Erie, Neutral, Lenape, Susquenhannock, Petun, Abenaki, Ojibwa, and Algonquin peoples, fighting campaigns from Virginia to the Mississippi and all the way to what is now northern Ontario.

Despite taking thousands of captives, the Five Nations populations continued to fall, as diseases continued to take their toll. French Jesuits, whom the Haudenosaunee were forced to accept after making peace with the French in 1667, encouraged Catholic converts to move to mission villages in the St. Lawrence river valley near Montreal and Quebec. In the 1640s, the Mohawk could field about 800 warriors. By the 1670s, they could field only 300 warriors, indicating population decline.

Melting pot
The Iroquois League traditions allowed for the dead to be symbolically replaced through captives taken in "mourning wars", the blood feuds and vendettas that were an essential aspect of Iroquois culture. As a way of expediting the mourning process, raids were conducted to take vengeance and seize captives. Captives were generally adopted directly by the grieving family to replace the member(s) who had been lost.

This process not only allowed the Iroquois to maintain their own numbers, but also to disperse and assimilate their enemies. The adoption of conquered peoples, especially during the period of the Beaver Wars (1609–1701), meant that the Iroquois League was composed largely of naturalized members of other tribes. Cadwallader Colden wrote, 
"It has been a constant maxim with the Five Nations, to save children and young men of the people they conquer, to adopt them into their own Nation, and to educate them as their own children, without distinction; These young people soon forget their own country and nation and by this policy the Five Nations make up the losses which their nation suffers by the people they lose in war."

Those who attempted to return to their families were harshly punished; for instance, the French fur trader Pierre-Esprit Radisson was captured by an Iroquois raiding party as a teenager, was adopted by a Mohawk family, and ran away to return to his family in Trois-Rivières. When he was recaptured, he was punished by having his fingernails pulled out and having one of his fingers cut to the bone. But Radisson was not executed, as his adoptive parents provided gifts to the families of the men whom Radisson had killed when he escaped, given as compensation for their loss. Several Huron who escaped with Radisson and were recaptured were quickly executed.

By 1668, two-thirds of the Oneida village were assimilated Algonquian and Huron. At Onondaga there were Native Americans of seven different nations, and among the Seneca eleven. They also adopted European captives, as did the Catholic Mohawk in settlements outside Montreal. This tradition of adoption and assimilation was common to native people of the Northeast.

Settlement

At the time of first European contact the Iroquois lived in a small number of large villages scattered throughout their territory. Each nation had between one and four villages at any one time, and villages were moved approximately every five to twenty years as soil and firewood were depleted. These settlements were surrounded by a palisade and usually located in a defensible area such as a hill, with access to water. Because of their appearance with the palisade, Europeans termed them castles. Villages were usually built on level or raised ground, surrounded by log palisades and sometimes ditches.

Within the villages the inhabitants lived in longhouses. Longhouses varied in size from 15 to 150 feet long and 15 to 25 feet in breadth. Longhouses were usually built of layers of elm bark on a frame of rafters and standing logs raised upright. In 1653, Dutch official and landowner Adriaen van der Donck described a Mohawk longhouse in his Description of New Netherland.

Usually, between 2 and 20 families lived in a single longhouse with sleeping platforms being 2 feet above the ground and food left to dry on the rafters. A castle might contain twenty or thirty longhouses. In addition to the castles the Iroquois also had smaller settlements which might be occupied seasonally by smaller groups, for example for fishing or hunting. Living in the smoke-filled longhouses often caused conjunctivitis.

Total population for the five nations has been estimated at 20,000 before 1634. After 1635 the population dropped to around 6,800, chiefly due to the epidemic of smallpox introduced by contact with European settlers. The Iroquois lived in extended families divided clans headed by clan mothers that grouped into moieities ("halves"). The typical clan consisted of about 50 to 200 people. The division of the Iroquois went as follows:
Cayuga 
Moiety (A) clans: Bear, Beaver, Heron, Turtle, Wolf
Moiety (B) clans: Turtle, Bear, Deer
Tuscarora
Moiety (A) clans: Bear, Wolf
Moiety (B) clans: Eel, Snipe, Beaver, Turtle, Deer
Seneca
Moiety (A) clans: Heron, Beaver, Bear, Wolf, Turtle
Moiety (B) clans: Deer, Hawk, Eel, Snipe
Onondaga
Moiety (A) clans: Tortoise, Wolf, Snipe, Eagle, Beaver
Moiety (B) clan: Bear, Hawk, Eel, Deer
Oneida
Moiety (A) clan: wolf
Moiety (B) clans: Bear, Turtle
Mohawk
Moiety (A) clans: Wolf, Bear
Moiety (B) clan: Turtle. Government was by the 50 sachems representing the various clans who were chosen by the clan mothers. Assisting the sachems were the "Pinetree Chiefs" who served as diplomats and the "War Chiefs" who led the war parties; neither the "Pinetree Chiefs" or the "War Chiefs" were allowed to vote at council meetings.

By the late 1700s The Iroquois were building smaller log cabins resembling those of the colonists, but retaining some native features, such as bark roofs with smoke holes and a central fireplace. The main woods used by the Iroquois to make their utensils were oak, birch, hickory and elm. Bones and antlers were used to make hunting and fishing equipment.

Food production

The Iroquois are a mix of horticulturalists, farmers, fishers, gatherers and hunters, though traditionally their main diet has come from farming. For the Iroquois, farming was traditionally women's work and the entire process of planting, maintaining, harvesting and cooking was done by women. Gathering has also traditionally been the job of women and children. Wild roots, greens, berries and nuts were gathered in the summer. During spring, sap is tapped from the maple trees and boiled into maple syrup, and herbs are gathered for medicine. After the coming of Europeans, the Iroquois started to grow apples, pears, cherries, and peaches.

Historically, the main crops cultivated by the Iroquois were corn, beans and squash, which were called the three sisters and in Iroquois tradition were considered special gifts from the Creator. These three crops could be ground up into hominy and soups in clay pots (later replaced by metal pots after the contact was with Europeans). Besides the "Three Sisters", the Iroquois diet also included artichokes, leeks, cucumbers, turnips, pumpkins, a number of different berries such blackberries, blueberries, gooseberries, etc. and wild nuts. Allium tricoccum, a species of wild onion, is also a part of traditional Iroquois cuisine, as well as Ribes triste (redcurrant), Apios americana (groundnut), and Cardamine diphylla (broadleaf toothwort).

Using these ingredients they prepared meals of boiled corn bread and cornmeal sweetened with maple syrup, known today as Indian pudding. Cornmeal was also used to make samp, a type of porridge with beans and dried meat. Reports from early American settlers mention Iroquois extracting corn syrup that was used as a sweetener for cornmeal dumplings.

The Iroquois hunted mostly deer but also other game such as wild turkey and migratory birds. Muskrat and beaver were hunted during the winter. Archaeologists have found the bones of bison, elk, deer, bear, raccoon, and porcupines at Iroquois villages. Fishing was also a significant source of food because the Iroquois had villages mostly in the St.Lawrence and Great Lakes areas. The Iroquois used nets made from vegetable fiber with weights of pebbles for fishing. They fished salmon, trout, bass, perch and whitefish until the St. Lawrence became too polluted by industry. In the spring the Iroquois netted, and in the winter fishing holes were made in the ice. Starting about 1620, the Iroquois started to raise pigs, geese and chickens, which they had acquired from the Dutch.

Dress

In 1644 Johannes Megapolensis described Mohawk traditional wear.

On their feet the Iroquois wore moccasins, "true to nature in its adjustment to the foot, beautiful in its materials and finish, and durable as an article of apparel."

Moccasins of a sort were also made of corn husks.

In 1653 Dutch official Adriaen van der Donck wrote:

During the 17th century, Iroquois clothing changed rapidly as a result of the introduction of scissors and needles obtained from the Europeans, and the British scholar Michael Johnson has cautioned that European accounts of Iroquois clothing from the latter 17th century may not have entirely reflected traditional pre-contact Iroquois clothing. In the 17th century women normally went topless in the warm months while wearing a buckskin skirt overlapping on the left while in the winter women covered their upper bodies with a cape-like upper garment with an opening for the head. By the 18th century, cloth colored red and blue obtained from Europeans became the standard material for clothing with the men and women wearing blouses and shirts that usually decorated with beadwork and ribbons and were often worn alongside silver brooches.

By the late 18th century, women were wearing muslin or calico long, loose-fitting overdresses. The tendency of Iroquois women to abandon their traditional topless style of dressing in the warm months reflected European influence. Married women wore their hair in a single braid held in place by a comb made of bone, antler or silver while unmarried wore their hair in several braids. Warriors wore moccasins, leggings and short kilts and on occasion wore robes that were highly decorated with painted designs. Initially, men's clothing was made of buckskin and were decorated with porcupine quill-work and later on was made of broadcloth obtained from Europeans. The bodies and faces of Iroquois men were heavily tattooed with geometric designs and their noses and ears were pieced with rings made up of wampun or silver. On the warpath, the faces and bodies of the warriors were painted half red, half black. The men usually shaved most of their hair with leaving only a tuft of hair in the center, giving the name Mohawk to their hair style. A cap made of either buckskin or cloth tied to wood splints called the Gus-to-weh that was decorated with feathers was often worn by men. Buckskin ammunition pouches with straps over the shoulder together with belts or slashes that carried powder horn and tomahawks were usually worn by warriors. Quilled knife cases were worn around the neck. Chiefs wore headdresses made of deer antler. By the 18th century, Iroquois men normally wore shirts and leggings made of broadcloth and buckskin coats. In the 17th and 18th centuries silver armbands and gorgets were popular accessories.

By the 1900s most Iroquois were wearing the same clothing as their non-Iroquois neighbors. Today most nations only wear their traditional clothing to ceremonies or special events.

Men wore a cap with a single long feather rotating in a socket called a gustoweh. Later, feathers in the gustoweh denote the wearer's tribe by their number and positioning. The Mohawk wear three upright feathers, the Oneida two upright and one down. The Onondaga wear one feather pointing upward and another pointing down. The Cayuga have a single feather at a forty-five degree angle. The Seneca wear a single feather pointing up, and the Tuscarora have no distinguishing feathers.

Writing in 1851 Morgan wrote that women's outfits consisted of a skirt "usually of blue broadcloth, and elaborately embroidered with bead-work. It requires two yards of cloth, which is worn with the selvedge at the top and bottom; the skirt being secured about the waist and descending nearly to the top of the moccasin." Under the skirt, between the knees and the moccasins, women wore leggings, called pantalettes by Morgan, "of red broadcloth, and ornamented with a border of beadwork around the lower edge ... In ancient times the gise'-hǎ was made of deer-skin and embroidered with porcupine-quill work." An over-dress of muslin or calico was worn over the skirt, it is "gathered slightly at the waist, and falls part way down the skirt ... In front it is generally buttoned with silver broaches." The blanket is two or three yards of blue or green broadcloth "it falls from the head or neck in natural folds the width of the cloth, as the selvedges are at the top and bottom, and it is gathered round the person like a shawl."

The women wore their hair very long and tied together at the back, or "tied at the back of the head and folded into a tress of about a hand's length, like a beaver tail ... they wear around the forehead a strap of wampum shaped like the headband that some was worn in olden times." "The men have a long lock hanging down, some on one side of the head, and some on both sides. On the top of their heads they have a streak of hair from the forehead to the neck, about the breadth of three fingers, and this they shorten until it is about two or three fingers long, and it stands right on end like a cock's comb or hog's bristles; on both sides of this cock's comb they cut all the hair short, except for the aforesaid locks, and they also leave on the bare places here and there small locks, such as aree in sweeping brushes and then they are in fine array." This is the forerunner to what is today called a "Mohawk hairstyle."

The women did not paint their faces. The men "paint their faces red, blue, etc."

Societies

Societies, often called "medicine societies", "medicine lodges", or "curing societies" played an important role in Iroquois social organization. Morgan says that each society "was a brotherhood into which new members were admitted by formal initiation." Originally the membership seems to have been on the basis of moiety, but by 1909 all societies seems to have been open to all men regardless of kinship.

It is believed that "most of the societies are of ancient origin and that their rituals have been transmitted with little change for many years." "Each society has a legend by which its origin and peculiar rites are explained." As part of his religious revolution, Handsome Lake "sought to destroy the societies and orders that conserved the older religious rites" A council of chiefs proclaimed that all animal and mystery societies should immediately dissolve, but through a defect in the form of the order the societies decided it was not legally binding and "went underground" becoming secret societies. Reviled by the "New Religion" of Handsome Lake, they were also rejected by the Christian Iroquois as holding pagan beliefs. Gradually, however, the societies came more into the open as hostility lessened.

A number of societies are known, of which the False Face Society is the most familiar. Others were the Little Water Society, the Pygmy Society, the Society of Otters, the Society of Mystic Animals, the Eagle Society, the Bear Society, the Buffalo Society, the Husk Faces, and the Woman's Society—which despite its name had male membership. The Sisters of the Deo-ha-ko was an organization of women.

During healing ceremonies, a carved "False Face Mask" is worn to represent spirits in a tobacco-burning and prayer ritual. False Face Masks are carved in living trees, then cut free to be painted and decorated. False Faces represent grandfathers of the Iroquois, and are thought to reconnect humans and nature and to frighten illness-causing spirits.

The Iroquois today have three different medicine societies. The False Face Company conducts rituals to cure sick people by driving away spirits; the Husk Face Society is made up of those who had dreams seen as messages from the spirits and the Secret Medicine Society likewise conducts rituals to cure the sick. There are 12 different types of masks worn by the societies. The types of masks are:
 The Secret Society of Medicine Men and the Company of Mystic Animals:
 Divided mask that painted half black and half red;
 Masks with exaggerated long noses;
 Horn masks;
 Blind masks without eye sockets.
 Husk Face Society:
 Masks made of braided corn.
 False Face Society:
 Whistling masks;
 Masks with smiling faces;
 Masks with protruding tongues;
 Masks with exaggerated hanging mouths;
 Masks with exaggerated straight lops;
 Masks with spoon-lips;
 Masks with a disfigured twisted mouth.

The "crooked face" masks with the twisted mouths, the masks with the spoon lips and the whistling masks are the "Doctor" masks. The other masks are "Common Face" or "Beggar" masks that are worn by those who help the Doctors.

The Husk Face Society performs rituals to communicate with the spirits in nature to ensure a good crop, the False Face Society performs rituals to chase away evil spirits, and the Secret Medicine Society performs rituals to cure diseases. The grotesque masks represent the faces of the spirits that the dancers are attempting to please. Those wearing Doctor masks blow hot ashes into the faces of the sick to chase away the evil spirits that are believed to be causing the illness. The masked dancers often carried turtle shell rattles and long staffs.

Medicine

Both male and female healers were knowledgeable in the use of herbs to treat illness, and could dress wounds, set broken bones, and perform surgery. Illness was believed to have a spiritual as well as a natural component, so spells, dances, ceremonies were used in addition to more practical treatments. There are three types of practitioners of traditional medicine: The "Indian doctor" or healer, who emphasizes the physical aspect of curing illness, the fortune-teller, who uses spiritual means to determine the cause of the patient's ailments and the appropriate cure, and the witch.

It was believed that knowledge of healing was given by supernatural creatures in the guise of animals.

In recent times, traditional medicine has co-existed with western medicine, with traditional practices more prevalent among followers of the Gaihwi:io (Longhouse Religion). People may resort to traditional practices for certain types of ailments, and to western medicine for other types, or they may use both traditional and western medicine to treat the same ailment as a form of double security.

The Iroquois societies are active in maintaining the practice of traditional medicine.

Women in society
The Iroquois have historically followed a matriarchal system. Men and women have traditionally had separate roles but both hold real power in the Nations. No person is entitled to 'own' land, but it is believed that the Creator appointed women as stewards of the land. Traditionally, the Clan Mothers appoint leaders, as they have raised children and are therefore held to a higher regard. By the same token, if a leader does not prove sound, becomes corrupt or does not listen to the people, the Clan Mothers have the power to strip him of his leadership. The chief of a clan can be removed at any time by a council of the women elders of that clan. The chief's sister has historically been responsible for nominating his successor. The clan mothers, the elder women of each clan, are highly respected.

The Iroquois have traditionally followed a matrilineal system, and hereditary leadership passes through the female line of descent, that is, from a mother to her children. The children of a traditional marriage belong to their mother's clan and gain their social status through hers. Her brothers are important teachers and mentors to the children, especially introducing boys to men's roles and societies. If a couple separates, the woman traditionally keeps the children. It is regarded as incest by the Iroquois to marry within one's matrilineal clan, but considered acceptable to marry someone from the same patrilineal clan.

Historically women have held the dwellings, horses and farmed land, and a woman's property before marriage has stayed in her possession without being mixed with that of her husband. The work of a woman's hands is hers to do with as she sees fit.

Historically, at marriage, a young couple lived in the longhouse of the wife's family (matrilocality). A woman choosing to divorce a shiftless or otherwise unsatisfactory husband is able to ask him to leave the dwelling and take his possessions with him.

Spiritual beliefs

Like many cultures, the Iroquois' spiritual beliefs changed over time and varied across tribes. Generally, the Iroquois believed in numerous deities, including the Great Spirit, the Thunderer, and the Three Sisters (the spirits of beans, maize, and squash). The Great Spirit was thought to have created plants, animals, and humans to control "the forces of good in nature", and to guide ordinary people. Orenda was the Iroquoian name for the magical potence found in people and their environment. The Iroquois believed in the orenda, the spiritual force that flowed through all things, and believed if people were respectful of nature, then the orenda would be harnessed to bring about positive results. There were three types of spirits for the Iroquois: 1) Those living on the earth 2) Those living above the earth and 3) the highest level of spirits controlling the universe from high above with the highest of those beings known variously as the Great Spirit, the Great Creator or the Master of Life.

Sources provide different stories about Iroquois creation beliefs. Brascoupé and Etmanskie focus on the first person to walk the earth, called the Skywoman or Aientsik. Aientsik's daughter Tekawerahkwa gave birth to twins, Tawiskaron, who created vicious animals and river rapids, while Okwiraseh created "all that is pure and beautiful". After a battle where Okwiraseh defeated Tawiskaron, Tawiskaron was confined to "the dark areas of the world", where he governed the night and destructive creatures. Other scholars present the "twins" as the Creator and his brother, Flint. The Creator was responsible for game animals, while Flint created predators and disease. Saraydar (1990) suggests the Iroquois do not see the twins as polar opposites but understood their relationship to be more complex, noting "Perfection is not to be found in gods or humans or the worlds they inhabit."

Descriptions of Iroquois spiritual history consistently refer to dark times of terror and misery prior to the Iroquois Confederacy, ended by the arrival of the Great Peacemaker. Tradition asserts that the Peacemaker demonstrated his authority as the Creator's messenger by climbing a tall tree above a waterfall, having the people cut down the tree, and reappearing the next morning unharmed. The Peacemaker restored mental health to a few of the most "violent and dangerous men", Ayonhwatha and Thadodaho, who then helped him bear the message of peace to others.

After the arrival of the Europeans, some Iroquois became Christians, among them the first Native American Saint, Kateri Tekakwitha, a young woman of Mohawk-Algonquin parents. The Seneca sachem Handsome Lake, also known as Ganeodiyo, introduced a new religious system to the Iroquois in the late 18th century, which incorporated Quaker beliefs along with traditional Iroquoian culture. Handsome Lake's teachings include a focus on parenting, appreciation of life, and peace. A key aspect of Handsome Lake's teachings is the principle of equilibrium, wherein each person's talents combined into a functional community. By the 1960s, at least 50% of Iroquois followed this religion.

Dreams play a significant role in Iroquois spirituality, providing information about a person's desires and prompting individuals to fulfill dreams. To communicate upward, humans can send prayers to spirits by burning tobacco.

Condolence ceremonies are conducted by the Iroquois for both ordinary and important people, but most notably when a hoyane (sachem) died. Such ceremonies were still held on Iroquois reservations as late as the 1970s. After death, the soul is thought to embark on a journey, undergo a series of ordeals, and arrive in the sky world. This journey is thought to take one year, during which the Iroquois mourn for the dead. After the mourning period, a feast is held to celebrate the soul's arrival in the skyworld.

"Keepers of the faith" are part-time specialists who conduct religious ceremonies. Both men and women can be appointed as keepers of the faith by tribe elders.

Haudenosaunee thanksgiving address
The Haudenosaunee thanksgiving address is a central prayer in Haudenosaunee tradition recited daily in the beginning of school days as well as social, cultural, and political events. The address gives thanks to the parts of nature necessary to ecosystem sustainability and emphasizes the ideology that all animals within an ecosystem are connected and each plays a vital role in it.

The phrasing of the address may vary depending on the speaker but is usually composed of 17 main sections and ends with a closing prayer. The 17 main sections are: 1) The people, 2) The Earth Mother, 3) The waters, 4) The fish, 5) plants, 6) food plants,7) medicine herbs, 8) animals, 9) trees, 10) birds, 11) four winds, 12) The Thunderers, 13) The Sun, 14) Grandmother Moon, 15) The stars, 16) The Enlightened Teachers, and 17) The Creator. Within each section, gratitude is given for the gifts that section provides to humanity.

The address serves as a pledge of gratitude as well as a “scientific inventory of the natural world.” By describing living and non-living elements of the ecosystem and their functions, uses and benefits, the pledge instills early concepts of traditional ecological knowledge within grade school children and onward.

Festivals
The Iroquois traditionally celebrate several major festivals throughout the year. These usually combine a spiritual component and ceremony, a feast, a chance to celebrate together, sports, entertainment and dancing. These celebrations have historically been oriented to the seasons and celebrated based on the cycle of nature rather than fixed calendar dates.

For instance, the Mid-winter festival,  ("The supreme belief") ushers in the new year. This festival is traditionally held for one week around the end of January to early February, depending on when the new moon occurs that year.

Iroquois ceremonies are primarily concerned with farming, healing, and thanksgiving. Key festivals correspond to the agricultural calendar, and include Maple, Planting, Strawberry, Green Maize, Harvest, and Mid-Winter (or New Year's), which is held in early February. The ceremonies were given by the Creator to the Iroquois to balance good with evil. In the 17th century, Europeans described the Iroquois as having 17 festivals, but only 8 are observed today. The most important of the ceremonies were the New Year Festival, the Maple Festival held in late March to celebrate spring, the Sun Shooting Festival which also celebrates spring, the Seed Dance in May to celebrate the planting of the crops, the Strawberry Festival in June to celebrate the ripening of the strawberries, the Thunder Ceremony to bring rain in July, the Green Bean Festival in early August, the Green Corn Festival in late August and the Harvest Festival in October. Of all the festivals, the most important were the Green Corn Festival to celebrate the maturing of the corn and the New Year Festival. During all of the festivals, men and women from the False Face Society, the Medicine Society and the Husk Face Society dance wearing their masks in attempt to humor the spirits that controlled nature. The most important of the occasions for the masked dancers to appear were the New Year Festival, which was felt to be an auspicious occasion to chase the malevolent spirits that were believed to cause disease.

Art

Iroquois art from the 16th and 17th centuries as found on bowls, pottery and clay pipes show a mixture of animal, geometrical and human imagery. Moose hair was sometimes attached to tumplines or burden straps for decorative effect. Porcupine quillwork was sewn onto bags, clothing and moccasins, usually in geometrical designs. Other designs included the "great turtle" upon North America was said to rest; the circular "skydome" and wavy designs. Beads and clothes often featured semi-circles and waves which meant to represent the "skydome" which consisted of the entire universe together with the supernatural world above it, parallel lines for the earth and curved lines for the "celestial tree". Floral designs were first introduced in the 17th century, reflecting French influence, but did not become truly popular until the 19th century. Starting about 1850 the Iroquois art began to frequently feature floral designs on moccasins, caps, pouches and pincushions, which were purchased by Euro-Americans. The British historian Michael Johnson described the Iroquois artwork meant to be sold to whites in the 19th century as having a strong feel of "Victoriana" to them. Silver was much valued by the Iroquois from the 17th century onward, and starting in the 18th century, the Iroquois became "excellent silversmiths", making silver earrings, gorgets and rings.

At harvest time, Iroquois women would use corn husks to make hats, dolls, rope and moccasins.

Games and sports
The favorite sport of the Iroquois was lacrosse ( in Seneca). This version was played between two teams of six or eight players, made up of members of two sets of clans (Wolf, Bear, Beaver, and Turtle on one side vs. Deer, Snipe, Heron, and Hawk on the other among the Senecas). A goal was scored by carrying or throwing a deer-skin ball between the goal posts using netted sticks—touching the ball with hands was prohibited. The game was played to a score of five or seven. The modern version of lacrosse remains popular as of 2015.

A popular winter game was the snow-snake game. The game was played between two sides of up to six players each, often boys, but occasionally between the men of two clans. It was not thrown but slid across the surface of the snow. The side whose snake went the farthest scored one point. Other snakes from the same side which went farther than any other snake of the opposing side also scored a point; the other side scored nothing. This was repeated until one side scored the number of points which had been agreed to for the game, usually seven or ten.

The Peach-stone game was a gambling game in which the clans bet against each other. Traditionally it was played on the final day of the Green Corn, Harvest, and Mid-winter festivals. The game was played using a wooden bowl about one foot in diameter and six peach-stones (pits) ground to oval shape and burned black on one side. A "bank" of beans, usually 100, was used to keep score and the winner was the side who won them all. Two players sat on a blanket-covered platform raised a few feet off the floor. To play the peach stones were put into the bowl and shaken. Winning combinations were five of either color or six of either color showing.

Players started with five beans each from the bank. The starting player shook the bowl; if he shook a five the other player paid him one bean, if a six five beans. If he shook either he got to shake again. If he shook anything else the turn passed to his opponent. All his winnings were handed over to a "manager" or "managers" for his side. If a player lost all of his beans another player from his side took his place and took five beans from the bank. Once all beans had been taken from the bank the game continued, but with the draw of beans now coming from the winnings of the player's side, which were kept out of sight so that no one but the managers knew how the game was going. The game was finished when one side had won all the beans.

The game sometimes took quite a while to play, depending on the starting number of beans, and games lasting more than a day were common.

The First Nations Lacrosse Association is recognized by World Lacrosse as a sovereign state for international lacrosse competitions. It is the only sport in which the Iroquois field national teams and the only indigenous people's organization sanctioned for international competition by any world sporting governing body.

Naming conventions
Each clan has a group of personal names which may be used to name members. The clan mother is responsible for keeping track of those names not in use, which may then be reused to name infants. When a child becomes an adult he takes a new "adult" name in place of his "baby" name. Some names are reserved for chiefs or faith keepers, and when a person assumes that office he takes the name in a ceremony in which he is considered to "resuscitate" the previous holder. If a chief resigns or is removed he gives up the name and resumes his previous one.

Cannibalism
Although the Iroquois are sometimes mentioned as examples of groups who practiced cannibalism, the evidence is mixed as to whether such a practice could be said to be widespread among the Six Nations, and to whether it was a notable cultural feature. Some anthropologists have found evidence of ritual torture and cannibalism at Iroquois sites, for example, among the Onondaga in the sixteenth century. However, other scholars, most notably anthropologist William Arens in his controversial book, The Man-Eating Myth, have challenged the evidence, suggesting the human bones found at sites point to funerary practices, asserting that if cannibalism was practiced among the Iroquois, it was not widespread. Modern anthropologists seem to accept the probability that cannibalism did exist among the Iroquois, with Thomas Abler describing the evidence from the Jesuit Relations and archaeology as making a "case for cannibalism in early historic times ... so strong that it cannot be doubted." Scholars are also urged to remember the context for a practice that now shocks the modern Western society. Sanday reminds us that the ferocity of the Iroquois' rituals "cannot be separated from the severity of conditions ... where death from hunger, disease, and warfare became a way of life".

The missionaries Johannes Megapolensis, François-Joseph Bressani, and the fur trader Pierre-Esprit Radisson present first-hand accounts of cannibalism among the Mohawk. A common theme is ritualistic roasting and eating the heart of a captive who has been tortured and killed. "To eat your enemy is to perform an extreme form of physical dominance."

Slavery 
Haudenosaunee peoples participated in "mourning wars" to obtain captives. Leland Donald suggests in "Slavery in Indigenous North America" that captives and slaves were interchangeable roles. There have been archaeological studies to support that Haudenosaunee peoples did in fact have a hierarchal system that included slaves. Note that the term slave in Haudenosaunee culture is identified by spiritual and revengeful purposes, not to be mistaken for the term slave in the African Slave Trade. However, once African slavery was introduced into North America by European settlers, some Iroquois, such as Mohawk chief Joseph Brant, did own African slaves.

Capture
To obtain captives, Haudenosaunee peoples fought "mourning wars". After the wars were over, Haudenosaunee warriors journeyed back to their villages with the enemies taken captive. During these journeys, captives were routinely tortured or even killed by their captors. Leland Donald writes that captives "were killed if they could not keep up, tried to escape, or members of the attacking party could not restrain their emotions". Daniel Richter suggests that keeping the pace may not have been an easy task, writing that "warriors might slowly lead prisoners by a rope between the lines of men, women and children [captives]". If a prisoner survived all the obstacles on the march back to a Haudenosaunee village, the torture did not end. Captives were mutilated and beaten for several days upon arrival by Haudenosaunee warriors. After the initiation process, they were either killed, or welcomed into the nation where they would be replacing a deceased member of that community.

Adoption policy
The Iroquois have absorbed many other individuals from various peoples into their tribes as a result of adopting war captives and giving refuge to displaced peoples. When such adoptees become fully assimilated, they are considered full members of their adoptive families, clans, and tribes. Historically, such adoptees have married into the tribes, and some have become chiefs or respected elders.

Slaves brought onto Haudenosaunee territory were mainly adopted into families or kin groups that had lost a person. Although if that person had been vital for the community they “were usually replaced by other kin-group members” and “captives were...adopted to fill lesser places”. During adoption rituals, slaves were to reject their former life and be renamed as part of their “genuine assimilation”. The key goal of Haudenosaunee slavery practices was to have slaves assimilate to Haudenosaunee culture to rebuild population after one or many deaths. Children and Indigenous peoples of neighbouring villages to the Haudenosaunee are said to have been good slaves because of their better ability to assimilate. That being said, the role of a slave was not a limited position and whenever slaves were available for capture they were taken, no matter their age, race, gender etc.

Once adopted, slaves in Haudenosaunee communities had potential to move up in society. Since slaves were replacing dead nation members, they took on the role of that former member if they could prove that they could live up to it. Their rights within the aforementioned framework were still limited though, meaning slaves performed chores or labor for their adoptive families. Also, there are a few cases where slaves were never adopted into families and their only role was to perform tasks in the village. These types of slaves may have been used solely for exchange. Slave trade was common in Haudenosaunee culture and it aimed to increase Haudenosaunee population.

Torture
Slaves were often tortured once captured by the Haudenosaunee. Torture methods consisted of, most notably, finger mutilation, among other things. Slaves endured torture not only on their journey back to Haudenosaunee nations, but also during initiation rituals and sometimes throughout their enslavement. Finger mutilation was common as a sort of marking of a slave. In "Northern Iroquoian Slavery", Starna and Watkins suggest that sometimes torture was so brutal that captives died before being adopted. Initial torture upon entry into the Haudenosaunee culture also involved binding, bodily mutilation with weapons, and starvation, and for female slaves: sexual assault. Starvation may have lasted longer depending on the circumstance. Louis Hennepin was captured by Haudenosaunee peoples in the 17th century and recalled being starved during his adoption as one of "Aquipaguetin"’s replacement sons. Indigenous slaves were also starved by their captors, such as Hennepin was. The brutality of Haudenosaunee slavery was not without its purposes; torture was used to demonstrate a power dynamic between the slave and the "master" to constantly remind the slave that they were inferior.

Language
Language played another role in Haudenosaunee slavery practices. Slaves were often referred to as "domestic animals" or "dogs" which were equivalent to the word to "slave". This use of language suggests that slaves were dehumanized, that slaves were "domesticated" and another that slaves were to be eaten as Haudenosaunee peoples ate dogs. Jaques Bruyas wrote a dictionary of the Mohawk language where the word “” is defined as "Animal domestique, serviteur, esclave" the English translation being "domestic animal, butler, slave". There are also more language accounts of slaves being compared to animals (mostly dogs) in Oneida and Onondaga language. This language serves as a proof not only that slavery did exist, but also that slaves were at the bottom of the hierarchy.

Changes after contact
Inevitably, Haudenosaunee slavery practices changed after European contact. With the arrival of European-introduced infectious diseases came the increase in Haudenosaunee peoples taking captives as their population kept decreasing. During the 17th century, Haudenosaunee peoples banded together to stand against settlers. By the end of the century, Haudenosaunee populations were made up mostly of captives from other nations. Among the Indigenous groups targeted by the Haudenosaunee were the Wyandot who were captured in such large numbers that they lost their independence for a large period of time. “Mourning wars” became essential to rebuilding their numbers, while at the same time Haudenosaunee warriors began launching raids on European colonial settlements. Similarly to Indigenous slaves, European slaves were tortured by the Haudenosaunee using finger mutilation and sometimes cannibalism. European captives did not make good slaves because they resisted even more than Indigenous captives and did not understand rituals such as renaming and forgetting their past. For this reason most European captives were either used as ransom or murdered upon arrival to Haudenosaunee territory. Many Europeans who were not captured became trading partners with the Haudenosaunee. Indigenous slaves were now being traded amongst European settlers and some slaves even ended up in Quebec households. Eventually, European contact led to adoptees outnumbering the Haudenosaunee in their own communities. The difficulty of controlling these slaves in large numbers ended Haudenosaunee slavery practices.

Government

The Grand Council of the Six Nations is an assembly of 56 Hoyenah (chiefs) or sachems. Sachemships are hereditary within a clan. When a position becomes vacant a candidate is selected from among the members of the clan and "raised up" by a council of all sachems. The new sachem gives up his old name and is thereafter addressed by the title.

Today, the seats on the Council are distributed among the Six Nations as follows:
 14 Onondaga
 10 Cayuga
 9 Oneida
 9 Mohawk 
 8 Seneca 
 6 Tuscarora 
When anthropologist Lewis Henry Morgan studied the Grand Council in the 19th century, he interpreted it as a central government. This interpretation became influential, but Richter argues that while the Grand Council served an important ceremonial role, it was not a government in the sense that Morgan thought. According to this view, Iroquois political and diplomatic decisions are made on the local level and are based on assessments of community consensus. A central government that develops policy and implements it for the people at large is not the Iroquois model of government.

Unanimity in public acts was essential to the Council. In 1855, Minnie Myrtle observed that no Iroquois treaty was binding unless it was ratified by 75% of the male voters and 75% of the mothers of the nation. In revising Council laws and customs, a consent of two-thirds of the mothers was required. The need for a double supermajority to make major changes made the Confederacy a de facto consensus government.

The women traditionally held real power, particularly the power to veto treaties or declarations of war. The members of the Grand Council of Sachems were chosen by the mothers of each clan. If any leader failed to comply with the wishes of the women of his tribe and the Great Law of Peace, the mother of his clan could demote him, a process called "knocking off the horns". The deer antlers, an emblem of leadership, were removed from his headgear, thus returning him to private life.

Councils of the mothers of each tribe were held separately from the men's councils. The women used men as runners to send word of their decisions to concerned parties, or a woman could appear at the men's council as an orator, presenting the view of the women. Women often took the initiative in suggesting legislation.

Wampum belts

The term "wampum" refers to beads made from purple and white mollusk shells on threads of elm bark. Species used to make wampum include the highly prized quahog clam (Mercenaria mercenaria) which produces the famous purple colored beads. For white colored beads the shells from the channeled whelk (Busycotypus canaliculatus), knobbed whelk (Busycon carica), lightning whelk (Sinistrofulgur perversum), and snow whelk (Sinistrofulgur laeostomum) are used.

Wampum was primarily used to make wampum belts by the Iroquois, which Iroquois tradition claims was invented by Hiawatha to console chiefs and clan mothers who lost family members to war. Wampum belts played a major role in the Condolence Ceremony and in the raising of new chiefs. Wampum belts are used to signify the importance of a specific message being presented. Treaty making often involved wampum belts to signify the importance of the treaty. A famous example is "The Two Row Wampum" or "Guesuenta", meaning "it brightens our minds", which was originally presented to the Dutch settlers, and then French, representing a canoe and a sailboat moving side-by-side along the river of life, not interfering with the other's course. All non-Native settlers are, by associations, members of this treaty. Both chiefs and clan mothers wear wampum belts as symbol of their offices.

"The Covenant Belt" was presented to the Iroquois at the signing of the Canandaigua Treaty. The belt has a design of thirteen human figures representing symbolically the Thirteen Colonies of the United States. The house and the two figures directly next to the house represent the Iroquois people and the symbolic longhouse. The figure on the left of the house represent the Seneca Nation who are the symbolic guardians of the western door (western edge of Iroquois territory) and the figure to the right of the house represents the Mohawk who are the keepers of the eastern door (eastern edge of Iroquois territory).

The Hiawatha belt is the national belt of the Iroquois and is represented in the Iroquois Confederacy flag. The belt has four squares and a tree in the middle which represents the original Five Nations of the Iroquois. Going from left to right the squares represent the Seneca, Cayuga, Oneida and Mohawk. The Onondaga are represented by an eastern white pine which represents the Tree of Peace. Traditionally the Onondaga are the peace keepers of the confederacy. The placement of the nations on the belt represents the actually geographical distribution of the six nations over their shared territory, with the Seneca in the far west and the Mohawk in the far east of Iroquois territory.

The Haudenosaunee flag created in the 1980s is based on the Hiawatha Belt ... created from purple and white wampum beads centuries ago to symbolize the union forged when the former enemies buried their weapons under the Great Tree of Peace." It represents the original five nations that were united by the Peacemaker and Hiawatha. The tree symbol in the center represents an Eastern White Pine, the needles of which are clustered in groups of five.

Influence on the United States

Historians in the 20th century have suggested the Iroquois system of government influenced the development of the United States's government, although the extent and nature of this influence has been disputed. Bruce Johansen proposes that the Iroquois had a representative form of government.

Consensus has not been reached on how influential the Iroquois model was to the development of United States' documents such as the Articles of Confederation and the U.S. Constitution. The influence thesis has been discussed by historians such as Donald Grinde and Bruce Johansen. In 1988, the United States Congress passed a resolution to recognize the influence of the Iroquois League upon the Constitution and Bill of Rights. In 1987, Cornell University held a conference on the link between the Iroquois' government and the U.S. Constitution.

Scholars such as Jack N. Rakove challenge this thesis. Stanford University historian Rakove writes, "The voluminous records we have for the constitutional debates of the late 1780s contain no significant references to the Iroquois" and notes that there are ample European precedents to the democratic institutions of the United States. In reply, journalist Charles C. Mann wrote that while he agreed that the specific form of government created for the United States was "not at all like" that of the Iroquois, available evidence does support "a cultural argument – that the well-known democratic spirit had much to do with colonial contact with the Indians of the eastern seaboard, including and especially the Iroquois," and (quoting Rakove) "that prolonged contact between the aboriginal and colonizing populations were important elements [sic] in the shaping of colonial society and culture." Historian Francis Jennings noted that supporters of the thesis frequently cite the following statement by Benjamin Franklin, made in a letter from Benjamin Franklin to James Parker in 1751: "It would be a very strange thing, if six Nations of ignorant savages should be capable of forming a Scheme for such a Union ... and yet that a like union should be impracticable for ten or a Dozen English Colonies," but he disagrees that it establishes influence. Rather, he thinks Franklin was promoting union against the "ignorant savages" and called the idea "absurd".

The anthropologist Dean Snow has stated that although Franklin's Albany Plan may have drawn inspiration from the Iroquois League, there is little evidence that either the Plan or the Constitution drew substantially from that source. He argues that "... such claims muddle and denigrate the subtle and remarkable features of Iroquois government. The two forms of government are distinctive and individually remarkable in conception."

Similarly, the anthropologist Elizabeth Tooker has concluded that "there is virtually no evidence that the framers borrowed from the Iroquois." She argues that the idea is a myth resulting from a claim made by linguist and ethnographer J.N.B. Hewitt that was exaggerated and misunderstood after his death in 1937. According to Tooker, the original Iroquois constitution did not involve representative democracy and elections; deceased chiefs' successors were selected by the most senior woman within the hereditary lineage in consultation with other women in the tribe.

International relations

The Grand Council of the Iroquois Confederacy declared war on Germany in 1917 during World War I and again in 1942 in World War II.

The Haudenosaunee government has issued passports since 1923, when Haudenosaunee authorities issued a passport to Cayuga statesman Deskaheh (Levi General) to travel to the League of Nations headquarters.

More recently, passports have been issued since 1997. Before 2001 these were accepted by various nations for international travel, but with increased security concerns across the world since the September 11 attacks, this is no longer the case. 
In 2010, the Iroquois Nationals lacrosse team was allowed by the U.S. to travel on their own passports to the 2010 World Lacrosse Championship in England only after the personal intervention of Secretary of State Hillary Clinton. However, the British government refused to recognize the Iroquois passports and denied the team members entry into the United Kingdom.

The Onondaga Nation spent $1.5 million on a subsequent upgrade to the passports designed to meet 21st-century international security requirements.

People

Nations
The first five nations listed below formed the original Five Nations (listed from east to west, as they were oriented to the sunrise); the Tuscarora became the sixth nation in 1722.
{| class="wikitable" style="margin-left: auto; margin-right: auto;"
|-
! English word !! Iroquoian words !! Meaning !! 17th/18th-century location
|- 
| Mohawk      || Kanien'kehá:ka || "People of the Great Flint"    || Mohawk River
|-
| Oneida       || Onyota'a:ka    || "People of the Standing Stone" || Oneida Lake
|-
| Onondaga || Onöñda'gega'''   || "People of the Hills"          || Onondaga Lake
|-
| Cayuga       || Gayogo̱ho:nǫʔ   || "People of the Great Swamp"    || Cayuga Lake
|-
| Seneca       || Onöndowá'ga:   || "People of the Great Hill"     || Seneca Lake and Genesee River
|-
| Tuscarora || Ska:rù:rę' || "Hemp Gatherers" || From North Carolina
|-
| colspan="4" |
|}

Clans

Within each of the six nations, people belonged to a number of matrilineal clans. The number of clans varies by nation, currently from three to eight, with a total of nine different clan names.

Population history
According to the Worldmark Encyclopedia of Cultures and Daily Life, the Iroquois Confederacy had 10,000 people at its peak, but by the 18th century, their population had decreased to 4,000, recovering only to 7,000 by 1910.

According to data compiled in 1995 by Doug George-Kanentiio, a total of 51,255 Six Nations people lived in Canada. These included 15,631 Mohawk in Quebec; 14,051 Mohawk in Ontario; 3,970 Oneida in Ontario; and a total of 17,603 of the Six Nations at the Grand River Reserve in Ontario. More recently according to the Six Nations Elected Council, some 12,436 on the Six Nations of the Grand River reserve, the largest First Nations reserve in Canada, as of December 2014 and 26,034 total in Canada.

In 1995, tribal registrations among the Six Nations in the United States numbered about 30,000 in total, with the majority of 17,566 in New York. The remainder were more than 10,000 Oneida in Wisconsin, and about 2200 Seneca-Cayuga in Oklahoma. As the nations individually determine their rules for membership or citizenship, they report the official numbers. (Some traditional members of the nations refuse to be counted.) There is no federally recognized Iroquois nation or tribe, nor are any Native Americans enrolled as Iroquois.

In the 2000 United States census, 80,822 people identified as having Iroquois ethnicity (which is similar to identifying as European), with 45,217 claiming only Iroquois ancestry. There are the several reservations in New York: Cayuga Nation of New York(~450,) St. Regis Mohawk Reservation (3248 in 2014), Onondaga Reservation (473 in 2014), Oneida Indian Nation (~ 1000), Seneca Nation of New York (~8000) and the Tuscarora Reservation (1100 in 2010). Some lived at the Oneida Nation of Wisconsin on the reservation there counting some 21,000 according to the 2000 census. Seneca-Cayuga Nation in Oklahoma has more than 5,000 people in 2011. In the 2010 Census, 81,002 persons identified as Iroquois, and 40,570 as Iroquois only across the United States. Including the Iroquois in Canada, the total population numbered over 125,000 as of 2009.

Modern communities
Several communities exist to this day of people descended from the tribes of the Iroquois confederacy.

Canada
Kahnawake Mohawk in Quebec
Kanesatake Mohawk in Quebec
Mohawk Nation of Akwesasne in Ontario and Quebec
Thames Oneida in Ontario
Six Nations of the Grand River Territory in Ontario
Tyendinaga Mohawk in Ontario
Wahta Mohawk in Ontario

United States
Cayuga Nation in New York
Ganienkeh Mohawk — not federally recognized
Kanatsiohareke Mohawk
Onondaga Nation in New York
Oneida Indian Nation in New York
Oneida Tribe of Indians in Wisconsin
St. Regis Band of Mohawk Indians in New York
Seneca Nation of New York
Seneca-Cayuga Tribe of Oklahoma
Tonawanda Band of Seneca of New York
Tuscarora Nation of New York

Prominent individuals

 Frederick Alexcee, artist (also of Tsimshian ancestry)
 Henry Armstrong, boxer, #2 in Ring Magazine's list of the 80 Best Fighters of the Last 80 Years
 Akiatonharónkwen or Joseph Louis Cook, a Mohawk leader born to Abenaki and African-American parents and adopted by the Mohawk
 Chief John Big Tree, Seneca chief and actor
 Governor Blacksnake (Chainbreaker) Thaonawyuthe, Seneca war chief
 Joseph Brant or Thayendanegea, Mohawk leader
 Canasatego, Onondaga leader, diplomat and spokesperson known for his speech at the 1744 Treaty of Lancaster, where he recommended that the British colonies emulate the Iroquois by forming a confederacy.
 Polly Cooper, Oneida who aided the Continental army during the American Revolution and was a friend of George Washington
 Cornplanter or Kaintwakon, Seneca chief
 Jesse Cornplanter, Seneca artist and author
 David Cusick, Tuscarora artist and author
 Deganawida or The Great Peacemaker, the traditional founder, along with Hiawatha, of the Haudenosaunee Confederacy
 Deserontyon (John Deseronto), prominent Mohawk war chief
 Gary Farmer, Cayuga actor
 Graham Greene, Oneida and award-winning Canadian actor
 Handsome Lake (Ganioda'yo), Seneca religious leader
 Cornelius Hill (Onangwatgo), last hereditary Oneida chief, also Episcopal priest
 Lillie Rosa Minoka Hill, Mohawk physician who was the second female American Indian doctor in the United States
 Little Beard Si-gwa-ah-doh-gwih ("Spear Hanging Down"), Seneca chief
 John Smoke Johnson (Sakayengwaraton), Mohawk chief
 Pauline Johnson, Canadian writer and performer popular in the late 19th century, of Mohawk-European ancestry
 Stan "Bulldog" Jonathan, Mohawk professional hockey left winger
 Ki Longfellow, novelist
 Tom Longboat (Cogwagee), Onondaga distance runner
 Oren Lyons, Onondaga, traditional Faithkeeper of the Turtle clan
 Shelley Niro, Mohawk filmmaker, photographer, and installation artist
 John Norton (Teyoninhokovrawen), Mohawk warrior and leader of Cherokee-Scottish ancestry (adopted by Mohawk)
 Skenandoa ("pine tree chief"), Oneida chief
 Ely S. Parker, also known as Donehogawa or Häsanoan′da, Seneca, Union Army officer during American Civil War; appointed Commissioner of Indian Affairs by President Ulysses S. Grant 
 Sanford Plummer, Seneca artist
 Red Jacket, Seneca orator and chief of the Wolf clan
 Robbie Robertson, Mohawk, songwriter, guitarist and singer who was part of The Band.
 Sayenqueraghta, Seneca war chief
 August Schellenberg, Mohawk-Métis actor
 Jay Silverheels, actor, Canadian Mohawk, portrayed Tonto the companion to The Lone Ranger on US TV series
 Joanne Shenandoah, Oneida singer, songwriter, actress and educator
 Tanacharison (Half-king), Seneca war leader during the Seven Years' War
 Kateri Tekakwitha, Mohawk-Algonquin, first Catholic Native American saint
Lyle Thompson, professional lacrosse player
Miles Thompson, professional lacrosse player
 Billy Two Rivers, Mohawk professional wrestler

See also

Covenant Chain
David Cusick
Delaware/Lenape
Economy of the Iroquois
Ely S. Parker
First Nations Lacrosse Association
Flying Head
Ganondagan State Historic Site
Gideon Hawley
Great Law of Peace
Handsome LakeHeritage MinutesHistory of New York (state)
History of Ontario
Iroquois mythology
Iroquois settlement of the north shore of Lake Ontario
Kahnawake Iroquois and the Rebellions of 1837–38
Mohawk Chapel
Red Jacket
Seven Nations of Canada
Sir William Johnson, 1st Baronet
Six Nations of the Grand RiverSketches of the Ancient History of the Six Nations''
Sullivan Expedition
Town Destroyer
Urban Indian

Notes

Footnotes

References

 
 
 
 
 
 
 
 
 
 
 
 
  (Iroquois and Their Neighbors) excerpt and text search
 
 
 
 
 
 
 
 
 
 
 
 
 
 
 
 
  (The Iroquoians and Their World) excerpt and text search
 
 
 
 
 
 
 
 
 
 
 
 
  3 volumes

External links

 Haudenosaunee Confederacy, official website
 Iroquois Indian Museum
 Canadian Genealogy (The Iroquois)
 
 

 
Indigenous peoples of the Northeastern Woodlands
First Nations in Ontario
First Nations in Quebec
Native American tribes in New York (state)
Native American tribes in Oklahoma
Central New York
Upstate New York
Native Americans in the American Revolution
Great Lakes tribes
Native American history of West Virginia